

317001–317100 

|-bgcolor=#E9E9E9
| 317001 ||  || — || August 10, 2001 || Palomar || NEAT || RAF || align=right | 1.4 km || 
|-id=002 bgcolor=#E9E9E9
| 317002 ||  || — || August 11, 2001 || Palomar || NEAT || — || align=right | 3.2 km || 
|-id=003 bgcolor=#E9E9E9
| 317003 ||  || — || August 1, 2001 || Palomar || NEAT || EUN || align=right | 1.5 km || 
|-id=004 bgcolor=#E9E9E9
| 317004 ||  || — || August 13, 2001 || Haleakala || NEAT || — || align=right | 1.2 km || 
|-id=005 bgcolor=#E9E9E9
| 317005 ||  || — || August 11, 2001 || Haleakala || NEAT || — || align=right | 1.9 km || 
|-id=006 bgcolor=#E9E9E9
| 317006 || 2001 QK || — || August 16, 2001 || Reedy Creek || J. Broughton || — || align=right | 3.6 km || 
|-id=007 bgcolor=#E9E9E9
| 317007 ||  || — || August 16, 2001 || Socorro || LINEAR || — || align=right | 2.3 km || 
|-id=008 bgcolor=#E9E9E9
| 317008 ||  || — || August 16, 2001 || Socorro || LINEAR || — || align=right | 2.3 km || 
|-id=009 bgcolor=#E9E9E9
| 317009 ||  || — || August 16, 2001 || Socorro || LINEAR || — || align=right | 1.9 km || 
|-id=010 bgcolor=#E9E9E9
| 317010 ||  || — || August 22, 2001 || Socorro || LINEAR || JUN || align=right | 1.5 km || 
|-id=011 bgcolor=#E9E9E9
| 317011 ||  || — || August 16, 2001 || Socorro || LINEAR || JUN || align=right | 1.7 km || 
|-id=012 bgcolor=#E9E9E9
| 317012 ||  || — || August 20, 2001 || Palomar || NEAT || — || align=right | 1.8 km || 
|-id=013 bgcolor=#E9E9E9
| 317013 ||  || — || August 19, 2001 || Socorro || LINEAR || — || align=right | 2.1 km || 
|-id=014 bgcolor=#E9E9E9
| 317014 ||  || — || August 11, 2001 || Haleakala || NEAT || EUN || align=right | 1.6 km || 
|-id=015 bgcolor=#fefefe
| 317015 ||  || — || August 23, 2001 || Anderson Mesa || LONEOS || NYS || align=right data-sort-value="0.86" | 860 m || 
|-id=016 bgcolor=#E9E9E9
| 317016 ||  || — || August 10, 2001 || Palomar || NEAT || — || align=right | 1.7 km || 
|-id=017 bgcolor=#E9E9E9
| 317017 ||  || — || August 21, 2001 || Kitt Peak || Spacewatch || — || align=right | 1.7 km || 
|-id=018 bgcolor=#E9E9E9
| 317018 ||  || — || August 22, 2001 || Socorro || LINEAR || — || align=right | 2.1 km || 
|-id=019 bgcolor=#d6d6d6
| 317019 ||  || — || August 23, 2001 || Socorro || LINEAR || EOS || align=right | 2.7 km || 
|-id=020 bgcolor=#fefefe
| 317020 ||  || — || August 23, 2001 || Anderson Mesa || LONEOS || — || align=right data-sort-value="0.97" | 970 m || 
|-id=021 bgcolor=#fefefe
| 317021 ||  || — || August 23, 2001 || Anderson Mesa || LONEOS || MAS || align=right | 1.00 km || 
|-id=022 bgcolor=#E9E9E9
| 317022 ||  || — || August 17, 2001 || Palomar || NEAT || — || align=right | 1.7 km || 
|-id=023 bgcolor=#d6d6d6
| 317023 ||  || — || August 24, 2001 || Anderson Mesa || LONEOS || EOS || align=right | 2.9 km || 
|-id=024 bgcolor=#E9E9E9
| 317024 ||  || — || August 24, 2001 || Anderson Mesa || LONEOS || JUN || align=right | 1.3 km || 
|-id=025 bgcolor=#E9E9E9
| 317025 ||  || — || August 24, 2001 || Anderson Mesa || LONEOS || — || align=right | 1.6 km || 
|-id=026 bgcolor=#E9E9E9
| 317026 ||  || — || August 24, 2001 || Anderson Mesa || LONEOS || — || align=right | 1.4 km || 
|-id=027 bgcolor=#E9E9E9
| 317027 ||  || — || August 24, 2001 || Anderson Mesa || LONEOS || EUN || align=right | 1.3 km || 
|-id=028 bgcolor=#fefefe
| 317028 ||  || — || August 24, 2001 || Desert Eagle || W. K. Y. Yeung || — || align=right data-sort-value="0.99" | 990 m || 
|-id=029 bgcolor=#E9E9E9
| 317029 ||  || — || August 24, 2001 || Socorro || LINEAR || — || align=right | 2.5 km || 
|-id=030 bgcolor=#d6d6d6
| 317030 ||  || — || August 25, 2001 || Anderson Mesa || LONEOS || 7:4 || align=right | 5.4 km || 
|-id=031 bgcolor=#E9E9E9
| 317031 ||  || — || August 20, 2001 || Palomar || NEAT || — || align=right | 2.3 km || 
|-id=032 bgcolor=#d6d6d6
| 317032 ||  || — || August 19, 2001 || Socorro || LINEAR || — || align=right | 4.1 km || 
|-id=033 bgcolor=#E9E9E9
| 317033 ||  || — || August 19, 2001 || Socorro || LINEAR || — || align=right | 1.5 km || 
|-id=034 bgcolor=#E9E9E9
| 317034 ||  || — || August 25, 2001 || Socorro || LINEAR || — || align=right | 2.0 km || 
|-id=035 bgcolor=#E9E9E9
| 317035 ||  || — || September 8, 2001 || Socorro || LINEAR || — || align=right | 1.4 km || 
|-id=036 bgcolor=#E9E9E9
| 317036 ||  || — || September 10, 2001 || Socorro || LINEAR || — || align=right | 2.4 km || 
|-id=037 bgcolor=#fefefe
| 317037 ||  || — || September 7, 2001 || Socorro || LINEAR || — || align=right data-sort-value="0.94" | 940 m || 
|-id=038 bgcolor=#E9E9E9
| 317038 ||  || — || September 12, 2001 || Socorro || LINEAR || — || align=right | 1.5 km || 
|-id=039 bgcolor=#E9E9E9
| 317039 ||  || — || September 12, 2001 || Socorro || LINEAR || — || align=right | 1.8 km || 
|-id=040 bgcolor=#d6d6d6
| 317040 ||  || — || September 10, 2001 || Socorro || LINEAR || ALA || align=right | 5.3 km || 
|-id=041 bgcolor=#E9E9E9
| 317041 ||  || — || September 10, 2001 || Socorro || LINEAR || — || align=right | 2.6 km || 
|-id=042 bgcolor=#d6d6d6
| 317042 ||  || — || September 11, 2001 || Anderson Mesa || LONEOS || — || align=right | 4.2 km || 
|-id=043 bgcolor=#E9E9E9
| 317043 ||  || — || September 12, 2001 || Socorro || LINEAR || — || align=right | 1.4 km || 
|-id=044 bgcolor=#E9E9E9
| 317044 ||  || — || September 12, 2001 || Socorro || LINEAR || — || align=right | 2.4 km || 
|-id=045 bgcolor=#fefefe
| 317045 ||  || — || September 12, 2001 || Socorro || LINEAR || MAS || align=right data-sort-value="0.90" | 900 m || 
|-id=046 bgcolor=#d6d6d6
| 317046 ||  || — || September 12, 2001 || Socorro || LINEAR || — || align=right | 3.5 km || 
|-id=047 bgcolor=#E9E9E9
| 317047 ||  || — || September 12, 2001 || Socorro || LINEAR || — || align=right | 3.4 km || 
|-id=048 bgcolor=#E9E9E9
| 317048 ||  || — || September 18, 2001 || Kitt Peak || Spacewatch || HEN || align=right | 1.3 km || 
|-id=049 bgcolor=#E9E9E9
| 317049 ||  || — || September 16, 2001 || Socorro || LINEAR || EUN || align=right | 1.7 km || 
|-id=050 bgcolor=#E9E9E9
| 317050 ||  || — || August 24, 2001 || Socorro || LINEAR || — || align=right | 2.5 km || 
|-id=051 bgcolor=#d6d6d6
| 317051 ||  || — || September 17, 2001 || Socorro || LINEAR || HIL3:2 || align=right | 7.5 km || 
|-id=052 bgcolor=#fefefe
| 317052 ||  || — || September 17, 2001 || Socorro || LINEAR || — || align=right data-sort-value="0.95" | 950 m || 
|-id=053 bgcolor=#E9E9E9
| 317053 ||  || — || September 20, 2001 || Socorro || LINEAR || EUN || align=right | 1.5 km || 
|-id=054 bgcolor=#fefefe
| 317054 ||  || — || September 20, 2001 || Socorro || LINEAR || — || align=right data-sort-value="0.93" | 930 m || 
|-id=055 bgcolor=#E9E9E9
| 317055 ||  || — || September 20, 2001 || Socorro || LINEAR || WIT || align=right | 1.3 km || 
|-id=056 bgcolor=#fefefe
| 317056 ||  || — || September 20, 2001 || Socorro || LINEAR || — || align=right | 1.0 km || 
|-id=057 bgcolor=#E9E9E9
| 317057 ||  || — || September 20, 2001 || Socorro || LINEAR || — || align=right | 1.7 km || 
|-id=058 bgcolor=#E9E9E9
| 317058 ||  || — || September 20, 2001 || Socorro || LINEAR || KON || align=right | 2.2 km || 
|-id=059 bgcolor=#fefefe
| 317059 ||  || — || September 20, 2001 || Socorro || LINEAR || — || align=right data-sort-value="0.62" | 620 m || 
|-id=060 bgcolor=#E9E9E9
| 317060 ||  || — || September 20, 2001 || Socorro || LINEAR || EUN || align=right | 1.7 km || 
|-id=061 bgcolor=#d6d6d6
| 317061 ||  || — || September 16, 2001 || Socorro || LINEAR || EOS || align=right | 2.8 km || 
|-id=062 bgcolor=#E9E9E9
| 317062 ||  || — || September 16, 2001 || Socorro || LINEAR || — || align=right | 1.3 km || 
|-id=063 bgcolor=#E9E9E9
| 317063 ||  || — || September 16, 2001 || Socorro || LINEAR || — || align=right | 2.7 km || 
|-id=064 bgcolor=#fefefe
| 317064 ||  || — || September 16, 2001 || Socorro || LINEAR || NYS || align=right data-sort-value="0.81" | 810 m || 
|-id=065 bgcolor=#E9E9E9
| 317065 ||  || — || September 16, 2001 || Socorro || LINEAR || — || align=right | 1.2 km || 
|-id=066 bgcolor=#fefefe
| 317066 ||  || — || September 19, 2001 || Socorro || LINEAR || — || align=right | 1.1 km || 
|-id=067 bgcolor=#fefefe
| 317067 ||  || — || September 19, 2001 || Socorro || LINEAR || NYS || align=right data-sort-value="0.76" | 760 m || 
|-id=068 bgcolor=#E9E9E9
| 317068 ||  || — || September 19, 2001 || Socorro || LINEAR || — || align=right | 1.8 km || 
|-id=069 bgcolor=#E9E9E9
| 317069 ||  || — || September 19, 2001 || Socorro || LINEAR || — || align=right | 1.9 km || 
|-id=070 bgcolor=#d6d6d6
| 317070 ||  || — || September 19, 2001 || Socorro || LINEAR || EOS || align=right | 2.4 km || 
|-id=071 bgcolor=#E9E9E9
| 317071 ||  || — || September 19, 2001 || Socorro || LINEAR || — || align=right | 1.7 km || 
|-id=072 bgcolor=#d6d6d6
| 317072 ||  || — || September 19, 2001 || Socorro || LINEAR || EOS || align=right | 2.5 km || 
|-id=073 bgcolor=#E9E9E9
| 317073 ||  || — || September 19, 2001 || Socorro || LINEAR || — || align=right | 1.4 km || 
|-id=074 bgcolor=#E9E9E9
| 317074 ||  || — || September 19, 2001 || Socorro || LINEAR || — || align=right | 2.2 km || 
|-id=075 bgcolor=#E9E9E9
| 317075 ||  || — || September 19, 2001 || Socorro || LINEAR || — || align=right | 1.6 km || 
|-id=076 bgcolor=#E9E9E9
| 317076 ||  || — || September 19, 2001 || Socorro || LINEAR || — || align=right | 1.3 km || 
|-id=077 bgcolor=#E9E9E9
| 317077 ||  || — || September 19, 2001 || Socorro || LINEAR || — || align=right | 2.1 km || 
|-id=078 bgcolor=#C2FFFF
| 317078 ||  || — || September 19, 2001 || Socorro || LINEAR || L5 || align=right | 13 km || 
|-id=079 bgcolor=#E9E9E9
| 317079 ||  || — || September 19, 2001 || Socorro || LINEAR || — || align=right | 2.5 km || 
|-id=080 bgcolor=#E9E9E9
| 317080 ||  || — || September 20, 2001 || Socorro || LINEAR || — || align=right | 1.1 km || 
|-id=081 bgcolor=#E9E9E9
| 317081 ||  || — || September 21, 2001 || Anderson Mesa || LONEOS || — || align=right | 3.9 km || 
|-id=082 bgcolor=#E9E9E9
| 317082 ||  || — || September 20, 2001 || Socorro || LINEAR || KAZ || align=right | 1.1 km || 
|-id=083 bgcolor=#E9E9E9
| 317083 ||  || — || September 20, 2001 || Socorro || LINEAR || — || align=right | 1.8 km || 
|-id=084 bgcolor=#E9E9E9
| 317084 ||  || — || September 20, 2001 || Socorro || LINEAR || — || align=right | 1.5 km || 
|-id=085 bgcolor=#E9E9E9
| 317085 ||  || — || September 22, 2001 || Socorro || LINEAR || — || align=right | 2.1 km || 
|-id=086 bgcolor=#E9E9E9
| 317086 ||  || — || September 25, 2001 || Socorro || LINEAR || RAF || align=right | 1.4 km || 
|-id=087 bgcolor=#d6d6d6
| 317087 ||  || — || September 20, 2001 || Socorro || LINEAR || — || align=right | 4.2 km || 
|-id=088 bgcolor=#E9E9E9
| 317088 ||  || — || September 21, 2001 || Palomar || NEAT || — || align=right | 1.5 km || 
|-id=089 bgcolor=#d6d6d6
| 317089 ||  || — || September 23, 2001 || Palomar || NEAT || — || align=right | 4.4 km || 
|-id=090 bgcolor=#fefefe
| 317090 ||  || — || September 18, 2001 || Anderson Mesa || LONEOS || V || align=right data-sort-value="0.89" | 890 m || 
|-id=091 bgcolor=#E9E9E9
| 317091 ||  || — || September 18, 2001 || Apache Point || SDSS || — || align=right | 2.6 km || 
|-id=092 bgcolor=#E9E9E9
| 317092 ||  || — || October 6, 2001 || Socorro || LINEAR || — || align=right | 2.3 km || 
|-id=093 bgcolor=#fefefe
| 317093 ||  || — || October 13, 2001 || Socorro || LINEAR || MAS || align=right data-sort-value="0.88" | 880 m || 
|-id=094 bgcolor=#E9E9E9
| 317094 ||  || — || October 7, 2001 || Palomar || NEAT || — || align=right | 2.1 km || 
|-id=095 bgcolor=#fefefe
| 317095 ||  || — || October 11, 2001 || Socorro || LINEAR || H || align=right | 1.1 km || 
|-id=096 bgcolor=#FA8072
| 317096 ||  || — || October 14, 2001 || Socorro || LINEAR || — || align=right data-sort-value="0.91" | 910 m || 
|-id=097 bgcolor=#d6d6d6
| 317097 ||  || — || October 14, 2001 || Socorro || LINEAR || — || align=right | 4.1 km || 
|-id=098 bgcolor=#d6d6d6
| 317098 ||  || — || October 14, 2001 || Socorro || LINEAR || — || align=right | 3.9 km || 
|-id=099 bgcolor=#E9E9E9
| 317099 ||  || — || October 14, 2001 || Socorro || LINEAR || — || align=right | 1.7 km || 
|-id=100 bgcolor=#E9E9E9
| 317100 ||  || — || October 15, 2001 || Socorro || LINEAR || — || align=right | 2.6 km || 
|}

317101–317200 

|-bgcolor=#fefefe
| 317101 ||  || — || October 12, 2001 || Anderson Mesa || LONEOS || MAS || align=right data-sort-value="0.97" | 970 m || 
|-id=102 bgcolor=#E9E9E9
| 317102 ||  || — || October 15, 2001 || Kitt Peak || Spacewatch || — || align=right | 2.6 km || 
|-id=103 bgcolor=#fefefe
| 317103 ||  || — || October 10, 2001 || Palomar || NEAT || NYS || align=right data-sort-value="0.83" | 830 m || 
|-id=104 bgcolor=#fefefe
| 317104 ||  || — || October 10, 2001 || Palomar || NEAT || — || align=right data-sort-value="0.65" | 650 m || 
|-id=105 bgcolor=#E9E9E9
| 317105 ||  || — || October 14, 2001 || Kitt Peak || Spacewatch || — || align=right | 2.5 km || 
|-id=106 bgcolor=#E9E9E9
| 317106 ||  || — || October 15, 2001 || Socorro || LINEAR || — || align=right | 2.0 km || 
|-id=107 bgcolor=#E9E9E9
| 317107 ||  || — || October 14, 2001 || Socorro || LINEAR || — || align=right | 1.8 km || 
|-id=108 bgcolor=#d6d6d6
| 317108 ||  || — || October 14, 2001 || Socorro || LINEAR || — || align=right | 3.7 km || 
|-id=109 bgcolor=#E9E9E9
| 317109 ||  || — || October 11, 2001 || Socorro || LINEAR || — || align=right | 3.0 km || 
|-id=110 bgcolor=#d6d6d6
| 317110 ||  || — || October 11, 2001 || Socorro || LINEAR || EOS || align=right | 2.6 km || 
|-id=111 bgcolor=#E9E9E9
| 317111 ||  || — || October 14, 2001 || Socorro || LINEAR || — || align=right | 2.4 km || 
|-id=112 bgcolor=#d6d6d6
| 317112 ||  || — || October 14, 2001 || Socorro || LINEAR || EOS || align=right | 2.8 km || 
|-id=113 bgcolor=#E9E9E9
| 317113 ||  || — || October 14, 2001 || Socorro || LINEAR || — || align=right | 2.4 km || 
|-id=114 bgcolor=#E9E9E9
| 317114 ||  || — || October 14, 2001 || Palomar || NEAT || — || align=right | 2.6 km || 
|-id=115 bgcolor=#fefefe
| 317115 ||  || — || October 7, 2001 || Palomar || NEAT || — || align=right | 1.6 km || 
|-id=116 bgcolor=#E9E9E9
| 317116 ||  || — || October 14, 2001 || Socorro || LINEAR || DOR || align=right | 3.8 km || 
|-id=117 bgcolor=#d6d6d6
| 317117 ||  || — || October 14, 2001 || Kitt Peak || Spacewatch || — || align=right | 2.9 km || 
|-id=118 bgcolor=#E9E9E9
| 317118 ||  || — || October 14, 2001 || Apache Point || SDSS || — || align=right | 1.3 km || 
|-id=119 bgcolor=#d6d6d6
| 317119 ||  || — || October 14, 2001 || Apache Point || SDSS || 628fast? || align=right | 2.1 km || 
|-id=120 bgcolor=#fefefe
| 317120 ||  || — || October 13, 2001 || Anderson Mesa || LONEOS || — || align=right | 1.4 km || 
|-id=121 bgcolor=#C2FFFF
| 317121 ||  || — || October 8, 2001 || Palomar || NEAT || L5 || align=right | 11 km || 
|-id=122 bgcolor=#E9E9E9
| 317122 ||  || — || November 12, 2001 || Apache Point || SDSS || — || align=right | 1.6 km || 
|-id=123 bgcolor=#fefefe
| 317123 ||  || — || October 25, 2001 || Desert Eagle || W. K. Y. Yeung || — || align=right | 1.2 km || 
|-id=124 bgcolor=#d6d6d6
| 317124 ||  || — || October 16, 2001 || Socorro || LINEAR || — || align=right | 3.4 km || 
|-id=125 bgcolor=#d6d6d6
| 317125 ||  || — || October 16, 2001 || Socorro || LINEAR || — || align=right | 5.2 km || 
|-id=126 bgcolor=#d6d6d6
| 317126 ||  || — || October 17, 2001 || Socorro || LINEAR || — || align=right | 2.7 km || 
|-id=127 bgcolor=#fefefe
| 317127 ||  || — || October 17, 2001 || Socorro || LINEAR || — || align=right | 1.1 km || 
|-id=128 bgcolor=#E9E9E9
| 317128 ||  || — || October 17, 2001 || Socorro || LINEAR || — || align=right | 2.2 km || 
|-id=129 bgcolor=#fefefe
| 317129 ||  || — || October 17, 2001 || Socorro || LINEAR || NYS || align=right data-sort-value="0.88" | 880 m || 
|-id=130 bgcolor=#fefefe
| 317130 ||  || — || October 17, 2001 || Socorro || LINEAR || — || align=right | 1.0 km || 
|-id=131 bgcolor=#fefefe
| 317131 ||  || — || October 18, 2001 || Socorro || LINEAR || H || align=right | 1.0 km || 
|-id=132 bgcolor=#E9E9E9
| 317132 ||  || — || October 20, 2001 || Socorro || LINEAR || — || align=right | 1.9 km || 
|-id=133 bgcolor=#d6d6d6
| 317133 ||  || — || October 17, 2001 || Kitt Peak || Spacewatch || EOS || align=right | 2.4 km || 
|-id=134 bgcolor=#d6d6d6
| 317134 ||  || — || October 21, 2001 || Kitt Peak || Spacewatch || — || align=right | 3.4 km || 
|-id=135 bgcolor=#fefefe
| 317135 ||  || — || October 20, 2001 || Haleakala || NEAT || — || align=right data-sort-value="0.96" | 960 m || 
|-id=136 bgcolor=#fefefe
| 317136 ||  || — || October 17, 2001 || Socorro || LINEAR || — || align=right data-sort-value="0.82" | 820 m || 
|-id=137 bgcolor=#E9E9E9
| 317137 ||  || — || October 20, 2001 || Socorro || LINEAR || EUN || align=right | 2.0 km || 
|-id=138 bgcolor=#E9E9E9
| 317138 ||  || — || October 22, 2001 || Socorro || LINEAR || — || align=right | 2.5 km || 
|-id=139 bgcolor=#d6d6d6
| 317139 ||  || — || October 22, 2001 || Palomar || NEAT || — || align=right | 4.1 km || 
|-id=140 bgcolor=#E9E9E9
| 317140 ||  || — || October 20, 2001 || Socorro || LINEAR || MAR || align=right | 1.5 km || 
|-id=141 bgcolor=#d6d6d6
| 317141 ||  || — || October 20, 2001 || Socorro || LINEAR || CRO || align=right | 5.0 km || 
|-id=142 bgcolor=#C2FFFF
| 317142 ||  || — || October 23, 2001 || Socorro || LINEAR || L5 || align=right | 16 km || 
|-id=143 bgcolor=#E9E9E9
| 317143 ||  || — || October 23, 2001 || Socorro || LINEAR || — || align=right | 2.1 km || 
|-id=144 bgcolor=#E9E9E9
| 317144 ||  || — || October 24, 2001 || Socorro || LINEAR || — || align=right | 2.6 km || 
|-id=145 bgcolor=#E9E9E9
| 317145 ||  || — || October 16, 2001 || Palomar || NEAT || — || align=right | 1.7 km || 
|-id=146 bgcolor=#fefefe
| 317146 ||  || — || October 18, 2001 || Palomar || NEAT || — || align=right | 1.0 km || 
|-id=147 bgcolor=#E9E9E9
| 317147 ||  || — || October 19, 2001 || Palomar || NEAT || — || align=right | 2.8 km || 
|-id=148 bgcolor=#E9E9E9
| 317148 ||  || — || October 23, 2001 || Palomar || NEAT || — || align=right | 1.4 km || 
|-id=149 bgcolor=#d6d6d6
| 317149 ||  || — || October 19, 2001 || Palomar || NEAT || — || align=right | 2.8 km || 
|-id=150 bgcolor=#d6d6d6
| 317150 ||  || — || October 19, 2001 || Palomar || NEAT || SHU3:2 || align=right | 7.0 km || 
|-id=151 bgcolor=#E9E9E9
| 317151 ||  || — || October 16, 2001 || Palomar || NEAT || NEM || align=right | 2.9 km || 
|-id=152 bgcolor=#E9E9E9
| 317152 ||  || — || October 25, 2001 || Apache Point || SDSS || MRX || align=right data-sort-value="0.96" | 960 m || 
|-id=153 bgcolor=#d6d6d6
| 317153 ||  || — || November 10, 2001 || Socorro || LINEAR || TIR || align=right | 3.9 km || 
|-id=154 bgcolor=#fefefe
| 317154 ||  || — || November 9, 2001 || Socorro || LINEAR || V || align=right data-sort-value="0.94" | 940 m || 
|-id=155 bgcolor=#d6d6d6
| 317155 ||  || — || November 11, 2001 || Socorro || LINEAR || — || align=right | 3.1 km || 
|-id=156 bgcolor=#E9E9E9
| 317156 ||  || — || November 13, 2001 || Ondřejov || P. Kušnirák || MAR || align=right | 1.7 km || 
|-id=157 bgcolor=#fefefe
| 317157 ||  || — || November 15, 2001 || Kitt Peak || Spacewatch || NYS || align=right | 1.0 km || 
|-id=158 bgcolor=#E9E9E9
| 317158 ||  || — || November 11, 2001 || Kitt Peak || Spacewatch || PAD || align=right | 2.4 km || 
|-id=159 bgcolor=#d6d6d6
| 317159 ||  || — || November 12, 2001 || Socorro || LINEAR || — || align=right | 4.2 km || 
|-id=160 bgcolor=#fefefe
| 317160 ||  || — || November 12, 2001 || Socorro || LINEAR || NYS || align=right data-sort-value="0.82" | 820 m || 
|-id=161 bgcolor=#d6d6d6
| 317161 ||  || — || November 11, 2001 || Apache Point || SDSS || — || align=right | 3.3 km || 
|-id=162 bgcolor=#d6d6d6
| 317162 ||  || — || November 11, 2001 || Apache Point || SDSS || — || align=right | 4.4 km || 
|-id=163 bgcolor=#d6d6d6
| 317163 ||  || — || November 11, 2001 || Apache Point || SDSS || — || align=right | 3.6 km || 
|-id=164 bgcolor=#E9E9E9
| 317164 ||  || — || November 17, 2001 || Socorro || LINEAR || — || align=right | 2.8 km || 
|-id=165 bgcolor=#fefefe
| 317165 ||  || — || November 18, 2001 || Socorro || LINEAR || — || align=right | 1.1 km || 
|-id=166 bgcolor=#d6d6d6
| 317166 ||  || — || November 19, 2001 || Socorro || LINEAR || — || align=right | 3.6 km || 
|-id=167 bgcolor=#d6d6d6
| 317167 ||  || — || November 19, 2001 || Socorro || LINEAR || — || align=right | 4.0 km || 
|-id=168 bgcolor=#E9E9E9
| 317168 ||  || — || November 19, 2001 || Socorro || LINEAR || GEF || align=right | 1.6 km || 
|-id=169 bgcolor=#E9E9E9
| 317169 ||  || — || November 19, 2001 || Socorro || LINEAR || — || align=right | 2.3 km || 
|-id=170 bgcolor=#E9E9E9
| 317170 ||  || — || November 20, 2001 || Socorro || LINEAR || — || align=right | 1.6 km || 
|-id=171 bgcolor=#E9E9E9
| 317171 ||  || — || November 20, 2001 || Socorro || LINEAR || — || align=right | 2.1 km || 
|-id=172 bgcolor=#fefefe
| 317172 ||  || — || November 20, 2001 || Socorro || LINEAR || FLO || align=right data-sort-value="0.65" | 650 m || 
|-id=173 bgcolor=#E9E9E9
| 317173 ||  || — || November 20, 2001 || Socorro || LINEAR || — || align=right | 2.5 km || 
|-id=174 bgcolor=#E9E9E9
| 317174 ||  || — || December 11, 2001 || Socorro || LINEAR || EUN || align=right | 1.7 km || 
|-id=175 bgcolor=#E9E9E9
| 317175 ||  || — || December 11, 2001 || Socorro || LINEAR || — || align=right | 3.5 km || 
|-id=176 bgcolor=#d6d6d6
| 317176 ||  || — || December 14, 2001 || Socorro || LINEAR || — || align=right | 4.7 km || 
|-id=177 bgcolor=#d6d6d6
| 317177 ||  || — || December 14, 2001 || Socorro || LINEAR || THM || align=right | 3.1 km || 
|-id=178 bgcolor=#E9E9E9
| 317178 ||  || — || December 14, 2001 || Socorro || LINEAR || AGN || align=right | 1.5 km || 
|-id=179 bgcolor=#E9E9E9
| 317179 ||  || — || December 14, 2001 || Socorro || LINEAR || PAD || align=right | 2.1 km || 
|-id=180 bgcolor=#d6d6d6
| 317180 ||  || — || December 14, 2001 || Socorro || LINEAR || TEL || align=right | 1.9 km || 
|-id=181 bgcolor=#E9E9E9
| 317181 ||  || — || November 12, 2001 || Kitt Peak || Spacewatch || — || align=right | 2.7 km || 
|-id=182 bgcolor=#fefefe
| 317182 ||  || — || December 15, 2001 || Socorro || LINEAR || NYS || align=right data-sort-value="0.87" | 870 m || 
|-id=183 bgcolor=#fefefe
| 317183 ||  || — || December 15, 2001 || Socorro || LINEAR || NYS || align=right data-sort-value="0.93" | 930 m || 
|-id=184 bgcolor=#E9E9E9
| 317184 ||  || — || December 14, 2001 || Kitt Peak || Spacewatch || — || align=right | 2.4 km || 
|-id=185 bgcolor=#d6d6d6
| 317185 ||  || — || December 8, 2001 || Anderson Mesa || LONEOS || — || align=right | 4.6 km || 
|-id=186 bgcolor=#E9E9E9
| 317186 ||  || — || December 8, 2001 || Anderson Mesa || LONEOS || — || align=right | 1.8 km || 
|-id=187 bgcolor=#E9E9E9
| 317187 ||  || — || December 13, 2001 || Palomar || NEAT || — || align=right | 3.0 km || 
|-id=188 bgcolor=#fefefe
| 317188 ||  || — || December 15, 2001 || Socorro || LINEAR || NYS || align=right data-sort-value="0.79" | 790 m || 
|-id=189 bgcolor=#FA8072
| 317189 ||  || — || December 19, 2001 || Socorro || LINEAR || — || align=right data-sort-value="0.91" | 910 m || 
|-id=190 bgcolor=#d6d6d6
| 317190 ||  || — || December 16, 2001 || Anderson Mesa || LONEOS || — || align=right | 3.4 km || 
|-id=191 bgcolor=#E9E9E9
| 317191 ||  || — || December 18, 2001 || Socorro || LINEAR || — || align=right | 2.4 km || 
|-id=192 bgcolor=#fefefe
| 317192 ||  || — || December 18, 2001 || Socorro || LINEAR || MAS || align=right data-sort-value="0.96" | 960 m || 
|-id=193 bgcolor=#E9E9E9
| 317193 ||  || — || December 18, 2001 || Socorro || LINEAR || — || align=right | 1.2 km || 
|-id=194 bgcolor=#d6d6d6
| 317194 ||  || — || December 17, 2001 || Socorro || LINEAR || — || align=right | 2.8 km || 
|-id=195 bgcolor=#d6d6d6
| 317195 ||  || — || December 18, 2001 || Apache Point || SDSS || — || align=right | 4.9 km || 
|-id=196 bgcolor=#fefefe
| 317196 ||  || — || January 9, 2002 || Socorro || LINEAR || NYS || align=right data-sort-value="0.86" | 860 m || 
|-id=197 bgcolor=#E9E9E9
| 317197 ||  || — || January 9, 2002 || Socorro || LINEAR || PAD || align=right | 2.4 km || 
|-id=198 bgcolor=#fefefe
| 317198 ||  || — || January 9, 2002 || Socorro || LINEAR || — || align=right data-sort-value="0.87" | 870 m || 
|-id=199 bgcolor=#fefefe
| 317199 ||  || — || January 8, 2002 || Socorro || LINEAR || — || align=right data-sort-value="0.90" | 900 m || 
|-id=200 bgcolor=#fefefe
| 317200 ||  || — || January 13, 2002 || Socorro || LINEAR || — || align=right | 1.6 km || 
|}

317201–317300 

|-bgcolor=#fefefe
| 317201 ||  || — || January 13, 2002 || Socorro || LINEAR || — || align=right data-sort-value="0.57" | 570 m || 
|-id=202 bgcolor=#E9E9E9
| 317202 ||  || — || January 9, 2002 || Socorro || LINEAR || WIT || align=right | 1.3 km || 
|-id=203 bgcolor=#E9E9E9
| 317203 ||  || — || January 14, 2002 || Socorro || LINEAR || — || align=right | 1.2 km || 
|-id=204 bgcolor=#E9E9E9
| 317204 ||  || — || January 12, 2002 || Nyukasa || Mount Nyukasa Stn. || HOF || align=right | 3.9 km || 
|-id=205 bgcolor=#E9E9E9
| 317205 ||  || — || January 9, 2002 || Apache Point || SDSS || AST || align=right | 1.9 km || 
|-id=206 bgcolor=#E9E9E9
| 317206 ||  || — || February 3, 2002 || Palomar || NEAT || — || align=right | 2.2 km || 
|-id=207 bgcolor=#FA8072
| 317207 ||  || — || February 6, 2002 || Socorro || LINEAR || — || align=right | 1.1 km || 
|-id=208 bgcolor=#d6d6d6
| 317208 ||  || — || February 10, 2002 || Cima Ekar || ADAS || — || align=right | 5.0 km || 
|-id=209 bgcolor=#fefefe
| 317209 ||  || — || February 5, 2002 || Palomar || NEAT || — || align=right | 1.0 km || 
|-id=210 bgcolor=#fefefe
| 317210 ||  || — || February 7, 2002 || Kitt Peak || Spacewatch || FLO || align=right data-sort-value="0.74" | 740 m || 
|-id=211 bgcolor=#d6d6d6
| 317211 ||  || — || February 7, 2002 || Socorro || LINEAR || YAK || align=right | 2.4 km || 
|-id=212 bgcolor=#FFC2E0
| 317212 ||  || — || February 11, 2002 || Socorro || LINEAR || AMO || align=right data-sort-value="0.65" | 650 m || 
|-id=213 bgcolor=#fefefe
| 317213 ||  || — || February 12, 2002 || Desert Eagle || W. K. Y. Yeung || — || align=right data-sort-value="0.81" | 810 m || 
|-id=214 bgcolor=#E9E9E9
| 317214 ||  || — || February 6, 2002 || Socorro || LINEAR || — || align=right | 1.1 km || 
|-id=215 bgcolor=#E9E9E9
| 317215 ||  || — || February 7, 2002 || Socorro || LINEAR || — || align=right | 3.5 km || 
|-id=216 bgcolor=#fefefe
| 317216 ||  || — || February 7, 2002 || Socorro || LINEAR || MAS || align=right data-sort-value="0.77" | 770 m || 
|-id=217 bgcolor=#E9E9E9
| 317217 ||  || — || February 7, 2002 || Socorro || LINEAR || — || align=right | 3.1 km || 
|-id=218 bgcolor=#fefefe
| 317218 ||  || — || February 7, 2002 || Socorro || LINEAR || ERI || align=right | 2.3 km || 
|-id=219 bgcolor=#d6d6d6
| 317219 ||  || — || February 7, 2002 || Socorro || LINEAR || CHA || align=right | 2.7 km || 
|-id=220 bgcolor=#fefefe
| 317220 ||  || — || February 7, 2002 || Socorro || LINEAR || FLO || align=right data-sort-value="0.76" | 760 m || 
|-id=221 bgcolor=#fefefe
| 317221 ||  || — || February 5, 2002 || Palomar || NEAT || — || align=right data-sort-value="0.83" | 830 m || 
|-id=222 bgcolor=#d6d6d6
| 317222 ||  || — || February 7, 2002 || Socorro || LINEAR || BRA || align=right | 2.6 km || 
|-id=223 bgcolor=#fefefe
| 317223 ||  || — || February 12, 2002 || Socorro || LINEAR || — || align=right | 1.3 km || 
|-id=224 bgcolor=#fefefe
| 317224 ||  || — || February 7, 2002 || Socorro || LINEAR || FLO || align=right data-sort-value="0.79" | 790 m || 
|-id=225 bgcolor=#fefefe
| 317225 ||  || — || February 11, 2002 || Socorro || LINEAR || H || align=right data-sort-value="0.69" | 690 m || 
|-id=226 bgcolor=#fefefe
| 317226 ||  || — || February 7, 2002 || Socorro || LINEAR || FLO || align=right data-sort-value="0.62" | 620 m || 
|-id=227 bgcolor=#E9E9E9
| 317227 ||  || — || February 8, 2002 || Socorro || LINEAR || — || align=right | 1.2 km || 
|-id=228 bgcolor=#E9E9E9
| 317228 ||  || — || February 8, 2002 || Socorro || LINEAR || — || align=right | 1.3 km || 
|-id=229 bgcolor=#d6d6d6
| 317229 ||  || — || February 8, 2002 || Socorro || LINEAR || — || align=right | 2.8 km || 
|-id=230 bgcolor=#d6d6d6
| 317230 ||  || — || January 12, 2002 || Palomar || NEAT || EOS || align=right | 2.6 km || 
|-id=231 bgcolor=#fefefe
| 317231 ||  || — || February 10, 2002 || Socorro || LINEAR || — || align=right data-sort-value="0.78" | 780 m || 
|-id=232 bgcolor=#fefefe
| 317232 ||  || — || February 10, 2002 || Socorro || LINEAR || V || align=right data-sort-value="0.87" | 870 m || 
|-id=233 bgcolor=#fefefe
| 317233 ||  || — || February 10, 2002 || Socorro || LINEAR || — || align=right data-sort-value="0.78" | 780 m || 
|-id=234 bgcolor=#fefefe
| 317234 ||  || — || January 18, 2002 || Socorro || LINEAR || FLO || align=right data-sort-value="0.78" | 780 m || 
|-id=235 bgcolor=#E9E9E9
| 317235 ||  || — || February 8, 2002 || Haleakala || NEAT || — || align=right | 2.7 km || 
|-id=236 bgcolor=#fefefe
| 317236 ||  || — || February 7, 2002 || Palomar || NEAT || — || align=right data-sort-value="0.61" | 610 m || 
|-id=237 bgcolor=#d6d6d6
| 317237 ||  || — || February 10, 2002 || Socorro || LINEAR || — || align=right | 3.2 km || 
|-id=238 bgcolor=#d6d6d6
| 317238 ||  || — || February 10, 2002 || Socorro || LINEAR || — || align=right | 3.0 km || 
|-id=239 bgcolor=#fefefe
| 317239 ||  || — || February 10, 2002 || Socorro || LINEAR || — || align=right data-sort-value="0.77" | 770 m || 
|-id=240 bgcolor=#E9E9E9
| 317240 ||  || — || February 10, 2002 || Socorro || LINEAR || — || align=right | 1.7 km || 
|-id=241 bgcolor=#E9E9E9
| 317241 ||  || — || February 10, 2002 || Socorro || LINEAR || — || align=right | 1.2 km || 
|-id=242 bgcolor=#fefefe
| 317242 ||  || — || February 12, 2002 || Kitt Peak || Spacewatch || — || align=right data-sort-value="0.86" | 860 m || 
|-id=243 bgcolor=#d6d6d6
| 317243 ||  || — || February 8, 2002 || Kitt Peak || Spacewatch || KAR || align=right | 1.1 km || 
|-id=244 bgcolor=#fefefe
| 317244 ||  || — || February 4, 2002 || Palomar || NEAT || FLO || align=right data-sort-value="0.68" | 680 m || 
|-id=245 bgcolor=#E9E9E9
| 317245 ||  || — || February 6, 2002 || Kitt Peak || M. W. Buie || — || align=right | 1.1 km || 
|-id=246 bgcolor=#d6d6d6
| 317246 ||  || — || February 8, 2002 || Anderson Mesa || LONEOS || — || align=right | 4.4 km || 
|-id=247 bgcolor=#d6d6d6
| 317247 ||  || — || February 8, 2002 || Palomar || NEAT || — || align=right | 5.2 km || 
|-id=248 bgcolor=#E9E9E9
| 317248 ||  || — || February 8, 2002 || Kitt Peak || Spacewatch || — || align=right | 1.9 km || 
|-id=249 bgcolor=#d6d6d6
| 317249 ||  || — || October 2, 2000 || Socorro || LINEAR || — || align=right | 4.5 km || 
|-id=250 bgcolor=#fefefe
| 317250 ||  || — || February 10, 2002 || Socorro || LINEAR || — || align=right data-sort-value="0.97" | 970 m || 
|-id=251 bgcolor=#d6d6d6
| 317251 ||  || — || February 11, 2002 || Socorro || LINEAR || — || align=right | 4.2 km || 
|-id=252 bgcolor=#E9E9E9
| 317252 ||  || — || February 10, 2002 || Socorro || LINEAR || INO || align=right | 1.3 km || 
|-id=253 bgcolor=#E9E9E9
| 317253 ||  || — || February 6, 2002 || Palomar || NEAT || RAF || align=right | 1.4 km || 
|-id=254 bgcolor=#fefefe
| 317254 ||  || — || February 6, 2002 || Palomar || NEAT || — || align=right data-sort-value="0.89" | 890 m || 
|-id=255 bgcolor=#FFC2E0
| 317255 ||  || — || February 21, 2002 || Kitt Peak || Spacewatch || APOPHA || align=right data-sort-value="0.39" | 390 m || 
|-id=256 bgcolor=#d6d6d6
| 317256 ||  || — || February 21, 2002 || Kitt Peak || Spacewatch || — || align=right | 3.3 km || 
|-id=257 bgcolor=#fefefe
| 317257 ||  || — || March 9, 2002 || Socorro || LINEAR || H || align=right data-sort-value="0.99" | 990 m || 
|-id=258 bgcolor=#fefefe
| 317258 ||  || — || March 5, 2002 || Kitt Peak || Spacewatch || — || align=right data-sort-value="0.68" | 680 m || 
|-id=259 bgcolor=#d6d6d6
| 317259 ||  || — || March 5, 2002 || Kitt Peak || Spacewatch || — || align=right | 3.7 km || 
|-id=260 bgcolor=#d6d6d6
| 317260 ||  || — || March 5, 2002 || Kitt Peak || Spacewatch || — || align=right | 2.0 km || 
|-id=261 bgcolor=#d6d6d6
| 317261 ||  || — || March 5, 2002 || Kitt Peak || Spacewatch || — || align=right | 3.7 km || 
|-id=262 bgcolor=#d6d6d6
| 317262 ||  || — || March 9, 2002 || Kitt Peak || Spacewatch || — || align=right | 2.7 km || 
|-id=263 bgcolor=#d6d6d6
| 317263 ||  || — || March 9, 2002 || Kitt Peak || Spacewatch || KOR || align=right | 2.0 km || 
|-id=264 bgcolor=#d6d6d6
| 317264 ||  || — || March 13, 2002 || Palomar || NEAT || FIR || align=right | 4.1 km || 
|-id=265 bgcolor=#d6d6d6
| 317265 ||  || — || March 9, 2002 || Socorro || LINEAR || — || align=right | 3.8 km || 
|-id=266 bgcolor=#fefefe
| 317266 ||  || — || March 13, 2002 || Socorro || LINEAR || NYS || align=right data-sort-value="0.74" | 740 m || 
|-id=267 bgcolor=#fefefe
| 317267 ||  || — || September 28, 2000 || Kitt Peak || Spacewatch || — || align=right data-sort-value="0.93" | 930 m || 
|-id=268 bgcolor=#E9E9E9
| 317268 ||  || — || March 13, 2002 || Socorro || LINEAR || — || align=right | 1.8 km || 
|-id=269 bgcolor=#fefefe
| 317269 ||  || — || March 13, 2002 || Socorro || LINEAR || MAS || align=right data-sort-value="0.99" | 990 m || 
|-id=270 bgcolor=#d6d6d6
| 317270 ||  || — || March 10, 2002 || Kitt Peak || Spacewatch || KOR || align=right | 1.4 km || 
|-id=271 bgcolor=#fefefe
| 317271 ||  || — || March 11, 2002 || Kitt Peak || Spacewatch || — || align=right data-sort-value="0.75" | 750 m || 
|-id=272 bgcolor=#fefefe
| 317272 ||  || — || March 9, 2002 || Anderson Mesa || LONEOS || FLO || align=right data-sort-value="0.98" | 980 m || 
|-id=273 bgcolor=#fefefe
| 317273 ||  || — || March 9, 2002 || Kitt Peak || Spacewatch || — || align=right data-sort-value="0.78" | 780 m || 
|-id=274 bgcolor=#E9E9E9
| 317274 ||  || — || March 11, 2002 || Kitt Peak || Spacewatch || — || align=right | 1.5 km || 
|-id=275 bgcolor=#d6d6d6
| 317275 ||  || — || March 10, 2002 || Kitt Peak || Spacewatch || — || align=right | 2.7 km || 
|-id=276 bgcolor=#fefefe
| 317276 ||  || — || March 12, 2002 || Palomar || NEAT || V || align=right data-sort-value="0.88" | 880 m || 
|-id=277 bgcolor=#d6d6d6
| 317277 ||  || — || March 12, 2002 || Palomar || NEAT || — || align=right | 3.4 km || 
|-id=278 bgcolor=#E9E9E9
| 317278 ||  || — || March 12, 2002 || Kitt Peak || Spacewatch || — || align=right | 1.7 km || 
|-id=279 bgcolor=#d6d6d6
| 317279 ||  || — || March 12, 2002 || Palomar || NEAT || — || align=right | 3.2 km || 
|-id=280 bgcolor=#d6d6d6
| 317280 ||  || — || March 15, 2002 || Palomar || NEAT || — || align=right | 3.5 km || 
|-id=281 bgcolor=#fefefe
| 317281 ||  || — || March 15, 2002 || Palomar || NEAT || — || align=right | 1.2 km || 
|-id=282 bgcolor=#fefefe
| 317282 ||  || — || March 11, 2002 || Palomar || NEAT || FLO || align=right data-sort-value="0.74" | 740 m || 
|-id=283 bgcolor=#fefefe
| 317283 ||  || — || March 5, 2002 || Apache Point || SDSS || — || align=right data-sort-value="0.76" | 760 m || 
|-id=284 bgcolor=#d6d6d6
| 317284 ||  || — || March 16, 2002 || Kitt Peak || Spacewatch || — || align=right | 3.0 km || 
|-id=285 bgcolor=#fefefe
| 317285 ||  || — || March 16, 2002 || Socorro || LINEAR || — || align=right | 1.1 km || 
|-id=286 bgcolor=#E9E9E9
| 317286 ||  || — || March 20, 2002 || Socorro || LINEAR || — || align=right | 2.9 km || 
|-id=287 bgcolor=#C2FFFF
| 317287 ||  || — || March 22, 2002 || Palomar || NEAT || L4 || align=right | 14 km || 
|-id=288 bgcolor=#d6d6d6
| 317288 ||  || — || April 5, 2002 || Emerald Lane || L. Ball || — || align=right | 3.6 km || 
|-id=289 bgcolor=#d6d6d6
| 317289 ||  || — || April 14, 2002 || Socorro || LINEAR || — || align=right | 4.1 km || 
|-id=290 bgcolor=#fefefe
| 317290 ||  || — || April 4, 2002 || Kitt Peak || Spacewatch || — || align=right | 1.2 km || 
|-id=291 bgcolor=#fefefe
| 317291 ||  || — || April 4, 2002 || Palomar || NEAT || V || align=right data-sort-value="0.57" | 570 m || 
|-id=292 bgcolor=#fefefe
| 317292 ||  || — || April 5, 2002 || Anderson Mesa || LONEOS || — || align=right data-sort-value="0.85" | 850 m || 
|-id=293 bgcolor=#d6d6d6
| 317293 ||  || — || April 8, 2002 || Socorro || LINEAR || — || align=right | 4.4 km || 
|-id=294 bgcolor=#d6d6d6
| 317294 ||  || — || April 8, 2002 || Kitt Peak || Spacewatch || — || align=right | 4.2 km || 
|-id=295 bgcolor=#fefefe
| 317295 ||  || — || April 8, 2002 || Palomar || NEAT || — || align=right data-sort-value="0.91" | 910 m || 
|-id=296 bgcolor=#d6d6d6
| 317296 ||  || — || April 9, 2002 || Anderson Mesa || LONEOS || EOS || align=right | 3.1 km || 
|-id=297 bgcolor=#fefefe
| 317297 ||  || — || April 9, 2002 || Palomar || NEAT || — || align=right | 1.1 km || 
|-id=298 bgcolor=#fefefe
| 317298 ||  || — || April 9, 2002 || Anderson Mesa || LONEOS || FLO || align=right data-sort-value="0.82" | 820 m || 
|-id=299 bgcolor=#fefefe
| 317299 ||  || — || April 10, 2002 || Socorro || LINEAR || — || align=right data-sort-value="0.95" | 950 m || 
|-id=300 bgcolor=#d6d6d6
| 317300 ||  || — || April 10, 2002 || Socorro || LINEAR || EOS || align=right | 3.0 km || 
|}

317301–317400 

|-bgcolor=#d6d6d6
| 317301 ||  || — || April 8, 2002 || Palomar || NEAT || THM || align=right | 2.5 km || 
|-id=302 bgcolor=#d6d6d6
| 317302 ||  || — || April 9, 2002 || Palomar || NEAT || — || align=right | 3.3 km || 
|-id=303 bgcolor=#E9E9E9
| 317303 ||  || — || April 10, 2002 || Socorro || LINEAR || — || align=right | 1.6 km || 
|-id=304 bgcolor=#fefefe
| 317304 ||  || — || April 10, 2002 || Socorro || LINEAR || — || align=right data-sort-value="0.95" | 950 m || 
|-id=305 bgcolor=#E9E9E9
| 317305 ||  || — || April 11, 2002 || Socorro || LINEAR || — || align=right | 2.0 km || 
|-id=306 bgcolor=#fefefe
| 317306 ||  || — || April 10, 2002 || Socorro || LINEAR || — || align=right | 1.1 km || 
|-id=307 bgcolor=#fefefe
| 317307 ||  || — || April 10, 2002 || Socorro || LINEAR || NYS || align=right data-sort-value="0.84" | 840 m || 
|-id=308 bgcolor=#fefefe
| 317308 ||  || — || April 12, 2002 || Socorro || LINEAR || — || align=right data-sort-value="0.97" | 970 m || 
|-id=309 bgcolor=#d6d6d6
| 317309 ||  || — || April 12, 2002 || Socorro || LINEAR || — || align=right | 3.8 km || 
|-id=310 bgcolor=#fefefe
| 317310 ||  || — || April 13, 2002 || Palomar || NEAT || — || align=right data-sort-value="0.93" | 930 m || 
|-id=311 bgcolor=#fefefe
| 317311 ||  || — || April 12, 2002 || Palomar || NEAT || V || align=right data-sort-value="0.93" | 930 m || 
|-id=312 bgcolor=#fefefe
| 317312 ||  || — || April 9, 2002 || Socorro || LINEAR || — || align=right data-sort-value="0.79" | 790 m || 
|-id=313 bgcolor=#d6d6d6
| 317313 ||  || — || April 13, 2002 || Palomar || NEAT || — || align=right | 3.8 km || 
|-id=314 bgcolor=#d6d6d6
| 317314 ||  || — || April 9, 2002 || Palomar || NEAT || EOS || align=right | 2.7 km || 
|-id=315 bgcolor=#fefefe
| 317315 ||  || — || April 9, 2002 || Palomar || NEAT || — || align=right data-sort-value="0.92" | 920 m || 
|-id=316 bgcolor=#C2FFFF
| 317316 ||  || — || February 21, 2001 || Kitt Peak || Spacewatch || L4 || align=right | 9.6 km || 
|-id=317 bgcolor=#d6d6d6
| 317317 ||  || — || April 16, 2002 || Socorro || LINEAR || — || align=right | 4.2 km || 
|-id=318 bgcolor=#d6d6d6
| 317318 ||  || — || April 21, 2002 || Palomar || NEAT || — || align=right | 3.4 km || 
|-id=319 bgcolor=#E9E9E9
| 317319 ||  || — || April 17, 2002 || Socorro || LINEAR || EUN || align=right | 1.8 km || 
|-id=320 bgcolor=#d6d6d6
| 317320 ||  || — || April 19, 2002 || Kitt Peak || Spacewatch || — || align=right | 3.3 km || 
|-id=321 bgcolor=#fefefe
| 317321 ||  || — || May 4, 2002 || Desert Eagle || W. K. Y. Yeung || — || align=right | 1.4 km || 
|-id=322 bgcolor=#fefefe
| 317322 ||  || — || May 5, 2002 || Socorro || LINEAR || PHO || align=right | 1.1 km || 
|-id=323 bgcolor=#E9E9E9
| 317323 ||  || — || May 3, 2002 || Palomar || NEAT || — || align=right | 1.2 km || 
|-id=324 bgcolor=#fefefe
| 317324 ||  || — || April 10, 2002 || Socorro || LINEAR || — || align=right data-sort-value="0.90" | 900 m || 
|-id=325 bgcolor=#fefefe
| 317325 ||  || — || May 6, 2002 || Palomar || NEAT || — || align=right | 1.2 km || 
|-id=326 bgcolor=#fefefe
| 317326 ||  || — || May 8, 2002 || Socorro || LINEAR || — || align=right | 1.2 km || 
|-id=327 bgcolor=#d6d6d6
| 317327 ||  || — || May 8, 2002 || Socorro || LINEAR || — || align=right | 4.3 km || 
|-id=328 bgcolor=#d6d6d6
| 317328 ||  || — || May 9, 2002 || Socorro || LINEAR || EOS || align=right | 3.2 km || 
|-id=329 bgcolor=#fefefe
| 317329 ||  || — || May 7, 2002 || Anderson Mesa || LONEOS || — || align=right | 1.2 km || 
|-id=330 bgcolor=#fefefe
| 317330 ||  || — || May 9, 2002 || Socorro || LINEAR || H || align=right | 1.2 km || 
|-id=331 bgcolor=#fefefe
| 317331 ||  || — || May 10, 2002 || Socorro || LINEAR || MAS || align=right data-sort-value="0.90" | 900 m || 
|-id=332 bgcolor=#d6d6d6
| 317332 ||  || — || May 8, 2002 || Socorro || LINEAR || — || align=right | 5.1 km || 
|-id=333 bgcolor=#fefefe
| 317333 ||  || — || May 11, 2002 || Socorro || LINEAR || — || align=right | 1.0 km || 
|-id=334 bgcolor=#fefefe
| 317334 ||  || — || May 11, 2002 || Socorro || LINEAR || — || align=right | 1.0 km || 
|-id=335 bgcolor=#E9E9E9
| 317335 ||  || — || May 11, 2002 || Socorro || LINEAR || AER || align=right | 1.9 km || 
|-id=336 bgcolor=#d6d6d6
| 317336 ||  || — || May 6, 2002 || Socorro || LINEAR || — || align=right | 3.8 km || 
|-id=337 bgcolor=#d6d6d6
| 317337 ||  || — || May 9, 2002 || Socorro || LINEAR || — || align=right | 3.6 km || 
|-id=338 bgcolor=#fefefe
| 317338 ||  || — || May 9, 2002 || Socorro || LINEAR || NYS || align=right data-sort-value="0.85" | 850 m || 
|-id=339 bgcolor=#d6d6d6
| 317339 ||  || — || May 10, 2002 || Socorro || LINEAR || EOS || align=right | 3.5 km || 
|-id=340 bgcolor=#fefefe
| 317340 ||  || — || May 5, 2002 || Palomar || NEAT || H || align=right data-sort-value="0.73" | 730 m || 
|-id=341 bgcolor=#d6d6d6
| 317341 ||  || — || May 6, 2002 || Socorro || LINEAR || TIR || align=right | 4.3 km || 
|-id=342 bgcolor=#d6d6d6
| 317342 ||  || — || May 6, 2002 || Palomar || NEAT || — || align=right | 6.1 km || 
|-id=343 bgcolor=#d6d6d6
| 317343 ||  || — || May 9, 2002 || Palomar || NEAT || — || align=right | 4.6 km || 
|-id=344 bgcolor=#d6d6d6
| 317344 ||  || — || May 11, 2002 || Socorro || LINEAR || — || align=right | 3.0 km || 
|-id=345 bgcolor=#fefefe
| 317345 ||  || — || May 16, 2002 || Socorro || LINEAR || H || align=right data-sort-value="0.80" | 800 m || 
|-id=346 bgcolor=#d6d6d6
| 317346 ||  || — || May 30, 2002 || Palomar || NEAT || — || align=right | 2.4 km || 
|-id=347 bgcolor=#d6d6d6
| 317347 ||  || — || June 8, 2002 || Socorro || LINEAR || — || align=right | 3.4 km || 
|-id=348 bgcolor=#fefefe
| 317348 ||  || — || June 10, 2002 || Socorro || LINEAR || FLO || align=right data-sort-value="0.87" | 870 m || 
|-id=349 bgcolor=#E9E9E9
| 317349 ||  || — || May 30, 2002 || Palomar || NEAT || — || align=right | 3.5 km || 
|-id=350 bgcolor=#FA8072
| 317350 ||  || — || June 10, 2002 || Palomar || NEAT || — || align=right | 1.1 km || 
|-id=351 bgcolor=#fefefe
| 317351 ||  || — || June 5, 2002 || Anderson Mesa || LONEOS || — || align=right data-sort-value="0.94" | 940 m || 
|-id=352 bgcolor=#fefefe
| 317352 ||  || — || June 3, 2002 || Palomar || NEAT || NYS || align=right data-sort-value="0.63" | 630 m || 
|-id=353 bgcolor=#fefefe
| 317353 ||  || — || June 12, 2002 || Palomar || NEAT || NYS || align=right data-sort-value="0.65" | 650 m || 
|-id=354 bgcolor=#E9E9E9
| 317354 ||  || — || February 16, 2001 || Nogales || Tenagra II Obs. || — || align=right | 2.9 km || 
|-id=355 bgcolor=#d6d6d6
| 317355 ||  || — || April 25, 2007 || Mount Lemmon || Mount Lemmon Survey || EOS || align=right | 3.2 km || 
|-id=356 bgcolor=#d6d6d6
| 317356 ||  || — || September 18, 2003 || Kitt Peak || Spacewatch || 7:4 || align=right | 5.0 km || 
|-id=357 bgcolor=#d6d6d6
| 317357 ||  || — || October 20, 2003 || Socorro || LINEAR || — || align=right | 4.1 km || 
|-id=358 bgcolor=#fefefe
| 317358 ||  || — || July 4, 2002 || Palomar || NEAT || — || align=right | 1.0 km || 
|-id=359 bgcolor=#fefefe
| 317359 ||  || — || July 3, 2002 || Palomar || NEAT || PHO || align=right | 1.3 km || 
|-id=360 bgcolor=#fefefe
| 317360 ||  || — || April 22, 2009 || Kitt Peak || Spacewatch || — || align=right | 1.0 km || 
|-id=361 bgcolor=#fefefe
| 317361 ||  || — || July 4, 2002 || Palomar || NEAT || NYS || align=right data-sort-value="0.79" | 790 m || 
|-id=362 bgcolor=#E9E9E9
| 317362 ||  || — || July 5, 2002 || Socorro || LINEAR || — || align=right | 1.2 km || 
|-id=363 bgcolor=#fefefe
| 317363 ||  || — || July 9, 2002 || Socorro || LINEAR || — || align=right data-sort-value="0.96" | 960 m || 
|-id=364 bgcolor=#fefefe
| 317364 ||  || — || July 13, 2002 || Haleakala || NEAT || — || align=right | 1.1 km || 
|-id=365 bgcolor=#d6d6d6
| 317365 ||  || — || July 9, 2002 || Socorro || LINEAR || TIR || align=right | 4.5 km || 
|-id=366 bgcolor=#E9E9E9
| 317366 ||  || — || February 17, 2001 || Kitt Peak || Spacewatch || — || align=right | 1.3 km || 
|-id=367 bgcolor=#fefefe
| 317367 ||  || — || July 14, 2002 || Palomar || NEAT || NYS || align=right data-sort-value="0.71" | 710 m || 
|-id=368 bgcolor=#fefefe
| 317368 ||  || — || July 5, 2002 || Palomar || NEAT || V || align=right data-sort-value="0.92" | 920 m || 
|-id=369 bgcolor=#fefefe
| 317369 ||  || — || July 4, 2002 || Palomar || NEAT || NYS || align=right data-sort-value="0.69" | 690 m || 
|-id=370 bgcolor=#d6d6d6
| 317370 ||  || — || July 14, 2002 || Palomar || NEAT || — || align=right | 3.9 km || 
|-id=371 bgcolor=#fefefe
| 317371 ||  || — || July 14, 2002 || Palomar || NEAT || EUT || align=right data-sort-value="0.69" | 690 m || 
|-id=372 bgcolor=#d6d6d6
| 317372 ||  || — || July 9, 2002 || Palomar || NEAT || KAR || align=right | 1.3 km || 
|-id=373 bgcolor=#d6d6d6
| 317373 ||  || — || July 9, 2002 || Palomar || NEAT || — || align=right | 2.8 km || 
|-id=374 bgcolor=#E9E9E9
| 317374 ||  || — || July 9, 2002 || Palomar || NEAT || — || align=right | 1.3 km || 
|-id=375 bgcolor=#E9E9E9
| 317375 ||  || — || July 4, 2002 || Palomar || NEAT || AGN || align=right | 1.5 km || 
|-id=376 bgcolor=#d6d6d6
| 317376 ||  || — || July 14, 2002 || Palomar || NEAT || — || align=right | 3.1 km || 
|-id=377 bgcolor=#fefefe
| 317377 ||  || — || September 6, 2005 || Siding Spring || SSS || H || align=right data-sort-value="0.78" | 780 m || 
|-id=378 bgcolor=#fefefe
| 317378 ||  || — || July 31, 2002 || Socorro || LINEAR || PHO || align=right | 2.1 km || 
|-id=379 bgcolor=#FA8072
| 317379 ||  || — || July 31, 2002 || Socorro || LINEAR || — || align=right | 1.9 km || 
|-id=380 bgcolor=#E9E9E9
| 317380 ||  || — || July 21, 2002 || Palomar || NEAT || — || align=right | 1.4 km || 
|-id=381 bgcolor=#E9E9E9
| 317381 ||  || — || July 21, 2002 || Palomar || NEAT || — || align=right data-sort-value="0.98" | 980 m || 
|-id=382 bgcolor=#d6d6d6
| 317382 ||  || — || March 23, 2006 || Kitt Peak || Spacewatch || KOR || align=right | 1.7 km || 
|-id=383 bgcolor=#fefefe
| 317383 ||  || — || July 21, 2002 || Palomar || NEAT || V || align=right data-sort-value="0.65" | 650 m || 
|-id=384 bgcolor=#d6d6d6
| 317384 ||  || — || January 7, 2006 || Mount Lemmon || Mount Lemmon Survey || — || align=right | 3.1 km || 
|-id=385 bgcolor=#d6d6d6
| 317385 ||  || — || March 8, 2005 || Mount Lemmon || Mount Lemmon Survey || — || align=right | 2.8 km || 
|-id=386 bgcolor=#E9E9E9
| 317386 ||  || — || December 17, 1999 || Kitt Peak || Spacewatch || — || align=right | 2.6 km || 
|-id=387 bgcolor=#d6d6d6
| 317387 ||  || — || December 2, 2005 || Mauna Kea || A. Boattini || MRC || align=right | 3.3 km || 
|-id=388 bgcolor=#fefefe
| 317388 ||  || — || February 9, 2007 || Mount Lemmon || Mount Lemmon Survey || — || align=right data-sort-value="0.87" | 870 m || 
|-id=389 bgcolor=#d6d6d6
| 317389 ||  || — || August 3, 2002 || Palomar || NEAT || — || align=right | 3.8 km || 
|-id=390 bgcolor=#d6d6d6
| 317390 ||  || — || August 3, 2002 || Palomar || NEAT || HYG || align=right | 3.2 km || 
|-id=391 bgcolor=#fefefe
| 317391 ||  || — || August 6, 2002 || Palomar || NEAT || H || align=right data-sort-value="0.82" | 820 m || 
|-id=392 bgcolor=#d6d6d6
| 317392 ||  || — || August 7, 2002 || Palomar || NEAT || — || align=right | 4.6 km || 
|-id=393 bgcolor=#fefefe
| 317393 ||  || — || August 10, 2002 || Socorro || LINEAR || — || align=right | 1.2 km || 
|-id=394 bgcolor=#fefefe
| 317394 ||  || — || August 10, 2002 || Socorro || LINEAR || PHO || align=right | 1.3 km || 
|-id=395 bgcolor=#d6d6d6
| 317395 ||  || — || June 17, 1996 || Kitt Peak || Spacewatch || EOS || align=right | 2.1 km || 
|-id=396 bgcolor=#fefefe
| 317396 ||  || — || August 10, 2002 || Socorro || LINEAR || NYS || align=right data-sort-value="0.84" | 840 m || 
|-id=397 bgcolor=#E9E9E9
| 317397 ||  || — || August 11, 2002 || Socorro || LINEAR || MAR || align=right | 1.6 km || 
|-id=398 bgcolor=#fefefe
| 317398 ||  || — || August 14, 2002 || Socorro || LINEAR || — || align=right | 1.6 km || 
|-id=399 bgcolor=#fefefe
| 317399 ||  || — || August 12, 2002 || Socorro || LINEAR || H || align=right data-sort-value="0.76" | 760 m || 
|-id=400 bgcolor=#fefefe
| 317400 ||  || — || August 13, 2002 || Kitt Peak || Spacewatch || MAS || align=right data-sort-value="0.68" | 680 m || 
|}

317401–317500 

|-bgcolor=#fefefe
| 317401 ||  || — || August 13, 2002 || Kitt Peak || Spacewatch || V || align=right data-sort-value="0.75" | 750 m || 
|-id=402 bgcolor=#fefefe
| 317402 ||  || — || August 13, 2002 || Anderson Mesa || LONEOS || — || align=right | 1.2 km || 
|-id=403 bgcolor=#fefefe
| 317403 ||  || — || August 13, 2002 || Socorro || LINEAR || V || align=right | 1.0 km || 
|-id=404 bgcolor=#FA8072
| 317404 ||  || — || August 14, 2002 || Socorro || LINEAR || — || align=right data-sort-value="0.79" | 790 m || 
|-id=405 bgcolor=#d6d6d6
| 317405 ||  || — || August 14, 2002 || Socorro || LINEAR || HYG || align=right | 4.3 km || 
|-id=406 bgcolor=#fefefe
| 317406 ||  || — || August 14, 2002 || Socorro || LINEAR || — || align=right | 1.2 km || 
|-id=407 bgcolor=#fefefe
| 317407 ||  || — || July 29, 2002 || Palomar || NEAT || — || align=right | 1.0 km || 
|-id=408 bgcolor=#d6d6d6
| 317408 ||  || — || August 8, 2002 || Palomar || S. F. Hönig || THB || align=right | 3.1 km || 
|-id=409 bgcolor=#E9E9E9
| 317409 ||  || — || August 8, 2002 || Palomar || S. F. Hönig || — || align=right data-sort-value="0.90" | 900 m || 
|-id=410 bgcolor=#E9E9E9
| 317410 ||  || — || August 15, 2002 || Palomar || NEAT || — || align=right | 1.9 km || 
|-id=411 bgcolor=#d6d6d6
| 317411 ||  || — || August 11, 2002 || Palomar || NEAT || EOS || align=right | 2.5 km || 
|-id=412 bgcolor=#d6d6d6
| 317412 ||  || — || August 15, 2002 || Palomar || NEAT || — || align=right | 3.0 km || 
|-id=413 bgcolor=#d6d6d6
| 317413 ||  || — || September 23, 2008 || Mount Lemmon || Mount Lemmon Survey || HYG || align=right | 4.3 km || 
|-id=414 bgcolor=#E9E9E9
| 317414 ||  || — || December 13, 1999 || Kitt Peak || Spacewatch || — || align=right | 1.3 km || 
|-id=415 bgcolor=#d6d6d6
| 317415 ||  || — || September 20, 2003 || Kitt Peak || Spacewatch || — || align=right | 4.5 km || 
|-id=416 bgcolor=#fefefe
| 317416 ||  || — || September 22, 1995 || Kitt Peak || Spacewatch || MAS || align=right data-sort-value="0.67" | 670 m || 
|-id=417 bgcolor=#d6d6d6
| 317417 ||  || — || October 23, 2008 || Kitt Peak || Spacewatch || KOR || align=right | 1.4 km || 
|-id=418 bgcolor=#E9E9E9
| 317418 ||  || — || December 19, 2007 || Kitt Peak || Spacewatch || — || align=right | 1.6 km || 
|-id=419 bgcolor=#E9E9E9
| 317419 ||  || — || October 16, 2007 || Kitt Peak || Spacewatch || — || align=right | 1.1 km || 
|-id=420 bgcolor=#E9E9E9
| 317420 ||  || — || August 1, 1998 || Caussols || ODAS || — || align=right | 1.5 km || 
|-id=421 bgcolor=#fefefe
| 317421 ||  || — || April 12, 2005 || Kitt Peak || Spacewatch || — || align=right data-sort-value="0.82" | 820 m || 
|-id=422 bgcolor=#d6d6d6
| 317422 ||  || — || May 21, 2006 || Kitt Peak || Spacewatch || — || align=right | 2.5 km || 
|-id=423 bgcolor=#fefefe
| 317423 ||  || — || August 19, 2002 || Palomar || NEAT || NYS || align=right data-sort-value="0.65" | 650 m || 
|-id=424 bgcolor=#E9E9E9
| 317424 ||  || — || August 24, 2002 || Palomar || NEAT || — || align=right | 1.2 km || 
|-id=425 bgcolor=#fefefe
| 317425 ||  || — || August 24, 2002 || Palomar || NEAT || V || align=right | 1.0 km || 
|-id=426 bgcolor=#fefefe
| 317426 ||  || — || August 21, 2002 || Palomar || NEAT || H || align=right data-sort-value="0.81" | 810 m || 
|-id=427 bgcolor=#fefefe
| 317427 ||  || — || August 28, 2002 || Palomar || NEAT || EUT || align=right data-sort-value="0.87" | 870 m || 
|-id=428 bgcolor=#fefefe
| 317428 ||  || — || August 26, 2002 || Palomar || NEAT || NYS || align=right data-sort-value="0.80" | 800 m || 
|-id=429 bgcolor=#E9E9E9
| 317429 ||  || — || August 27, 2002 || Palomar || NEAT || — || align=right | 1.2 km || 
|-id=430 bgcolor=#fefefe
| 317430 ||  || — || August 27, 2002 || Palomar || NEAT || V || align=right data-sort-value="0.72" | 720 m || 
|-id=431 bgcolor=#d6d6d6
| 317431 ||  || — || August 29, 2002 || Kitt Peak || Spacewatch || THM || align=right | 3.0 km || 
|-id=432 bgcolor=#d6d6d6
| 317432 ||  || — || August 29, 2002 || Kitt Peak || Spacewatch || — || align=right | 2.8 km || 
|-id=433 bgcolor=#d6d6d6
| 317433 ||  || — || August 29, 2002 || Palomar || NEAT || HYG || align=right | 4.8 km || 
|-id=434 bgcolor=#d6d6d6
| 317434 ||  || — || August 29, 2002 || Palomar || NEAT || — || align=right | 3.9 km || 
|-id=435 bgcolor=#E9E9E9
| 317435 ||  || — || August 30, 2002 || Palomar || R. Matson || — || align=right | 1.8 km || 
|-id=436 bgcolor=#E9E9E9
| 317436 ||  || — || August 16, 2002 || Palomar || A. Lowe || — || align=right | 1.0 km || 
|-id=437 bgcolor=#E9E9E9
| 317437 ||  || — || August 16, 2002 || Palomar || NEAT || HOF || align=right | 3.7 km || 
|-id=438 bgcolor=#d6d6d6
| 317438 ||  || — || August 29, 2002 || Palomar || NEAT || EOS || align=right | 3.4 km || 
|-id=439 bgcolor=#E9E9E9
| 317439 ||  || — || August 28, 2002 || Palomar || NEAT || — || align=right | 2.4 km || 
|-id=440 bgcolor=#d6d6d6
| 317440 ||  || — || August 29, 2002 || Palomar || NEAT || HYG || align=right | 3.4 km || 
|-id=441 bgcolor=#fefefe
| 317441 ||  || — || August 30, 2002 || Palomar || NEAT || — || align=right data-sort-value="0.97" | 970 m || 
|-id=442 bgcolor=#fefefe
| 317442 ||  || — || August 19, 2002 || Palomar || NEAT || V || align=right data-sort-value="0.89" | 890 m || 
|-id=443 bgcolor=#E9E9E9
| 317443 ||  || — || August 17, 2002 || Palomar || NEAT || AGN || align=right | 1.3 km || 
|-id=444 bgcolor=#fefefe
| 317444 ||  || — || August 17, 2002 || Palomar || NEAT || V || align=right data-sort-value="0.72" | 720 m || 
|-id=445 bgcolor=#d6d6d6
| 317445 ||  || — || August 17, 2002 || Palomar || NEAT || — || align=right | 3.2 km || 
|-id=446 bgcolor=#fefefe
| 317446 ||  || — || August 27, 2002 || Palomar || NEAT || — || align=right data-sort-value="0.86" | 860 m || 
|-id=447 bgcolor=#d6d6d6
| 317447 ||  || — || August 16, 2002 || Palomar || NEAT || — || align=right | 3.2 km || 
|-id=448 bgcolor=#d6d6d6
| 317448 ||  || — || October 27, 2003 || Anderson Mesa || LONEOS || 7:4 || align=right | 5.9 km || 
|-id=449 bgcolor=#d6d6d6
| 317449 ||  || — || September 13, 2007 || Mount Lemmon || Mount Lemmon Survey || — || align=right | 3.2 km || 
|-id=450 bgcolor=#fefefe
| 317450 ||  || — || August 21, 2006 || Kitt Peak || Spacewatch || NYS || align=right data-sort-value="0.83" | 830 m || 
|-id=451 bgcolor=#E9E9E9
| 317451 ||  || — || August 17, 2002 || Palomar || NEAT || — || align=right | 1.7 km || 
|-id=452 bgcolor=#E9E9E9
| 317452 Wurukang ||  ||  || August 7, 2010 || XuYi || PMO NEO || — || align=right | 1.1 km || 
|-id=453 bgcolor=#E9E9E9
| 317453 ||  || — || November 30, 2008 || Kitt Peak || Spacewatch || — || align=right | 2.5 km || 
|-id=454 bgcolor=#d6d6d6
| 317454 ||  || — || March 23, 2006 || Kitt Peak || Spacewatch || — || align=right | 2.8 km || 
|-id=455 bgcolor=#fefefe
| 317455 ||  || — || July 28, 2009 || Kitt Peak || Spacewatch || — || align=right | 1.2 km || 
|-id=456 bgcolor=#fefefe
| 317456 ||  || — || September 2, 2002 || Ondřejov || P. Kušnirák || — || align=right data-sort-value="0.56" | 560 m || 
|-id=457 bgcolor=#d6d6d6
| 317457 ||  || — || September 4, 2002 || Palomar || NEAT || — || align=right | 3.1 km || 
|-id=458 bgcolor=#fefefe
| 317458 ||  || — || September 4, 2002 || Anderson Mesa || LONEOS || — || align=right data-sort-value="0.94" | 940 m || 
|-id=459 bgcolor=#fefefe
| 317459 ||  || — || September 4, 2002 || Anderson Mesa || LONEOS || MAS || align=right data-sort-value="0.82" | 820 m || 
|-id=460 bgcolor=#fefefe
| 317460 ||  || — || September 5, 2002 || Socorro || LINEAR || — || align=right | 1.1 km || 
|-id=461 bgcolor=#fefefe
| 317461 ||  || — || September 5, 2002 || Socorro || LINEAR || — || align=right | 1.7 km || 
|-id=462 bgcolor=#fefefe
| 317462 ||  || — || September 4, 2002 || Anderson Mesa || LONEOS || H || align=right data-sort-value="0.94" | 940 m || 
|-id=463 bgcolor=#fefefe
| 317463 ||  || — || September 8, 2002 || Haleakala || NEAT || — || align=right | 1.2 km || 
|-id=464 bgcolor=#fefefe
| 317464 ||  || — || September 10, 2002 || Palomar || NEAT || — || align=right | 2.7 km || 
|-id=465 bgcolor=#E9E9E9
| 317465 ||  || — || September 10, 2002 || Palomar || NEAT || — || align=right | 2.7 km || 
|-id=466 bgcolor=#fefefe
| 317466 ||  || — || September 12, 2002 || Palomar || NEAT || — || align=right | 1.3 km || 
|-id=467 bgcolor=#d6d6d6
| 317467 ||  || — || September 11, 2002 || Palomar || NEAT || LUT || align=right | 5.1 km || 
|-id=468 bgcolor=#fefefe
| 317468 ||  || — || September 11, 2002 || Palomar || NEAT || — || align=right data-sort-value="0.95" | 950 m || 
|-id=469 bgcolor=#fefefe
| 317469 ||  || — || September 11, 2002 || Palomar || NEAT || — || align=right | 1.1 km || 
|-id=470 bgcolor=#E9E9E9
| 317470 ||  || — || September 11, 2002 || Palomar || NEAT || AGN || align=right | 1.3 km || 
|-id=471 bgcolor=#d6d6d6
| 317471 ||  || — || September 11, 2002 || Palomar || NEAT || 7:4 || align=right | 5.4 km || 
|-id=472 bgcolor=#fefefe
| 317472 ||  || — || September 12, 2002 || Palomar || NEAT || — || align=right | 1.1 km || 
|-id=473 bgcolor=#E9E9E9
| 317473 ||  || — || September 13, 2002 || Palomar || NEAT || — || align=right | 1.4 km || 
|-id=474 bgcolor=#E9E9E9
| 317474 ||  || — || September 13, 2002 || Palomar || NEAT || GEF || align=right | 1.6 km || 
|-id=475 bgcolor=#fefefe
| 317475 ||  || — || September 12, 2002 || Palomar || NEAT || NYS || align=right data-sort-value="0.82" | 820 m || 
|-id=476 bgcolor=#fefefe
| 317476 ||  || — || September 12, 2002 || Palomar || NEAT || V || align=right data-sort-value="0.79" | 790 m || 
|-id=477 bgcolor=#E9E9E9
| 317477 ||  || — || September 13, 2002 || Palomar || NEAT || HOF || align=right | 3.1 km || 
|-id=478 bgcolor=#fefefe
| 317478 ||  || — || September 13, 2002 || Anderson Mesa || LONEOS || H || align=right | 1.0 km || 
|-id=479 bgcolor=#d6d6d6
| 317479 ||  || — || September 15, 2002 || Palomar || NEAT || — || align=right | 3.4 km || 
|-id=480 bgcolor=#fefefe
| 317480 ||  || — || September 1, 2002 || Palomar || S. F. Hönig || NYS || align=right data-sort-value="0.59" | 590 m || 
|-id=481 bgcolor=#d6d6d6
| 317481 ||  || — || September 14, 2002 || Palomar || NEAT || — || align=right | 2.7 km || 
|-id=482 bgcolor=#E9E9E9
| 317482 ||  || — || September 13, 2002 || Palomar || NEAT || — || align=right | 1.9 km || 
|-id=483 bgcolor=#d6d6d6
| 317483 ||  || — || September 15, 2002 || Palomar || NEAT || — || align=right | 3.1 km || 
|-id=484 bgcolor=#d6d6d6
| 317484 ||  || — || September 4, 2002 || Palomar || NEAT || 7:4 || align=right | 4.1 km || 
|-id=485 bgcolor=#d6d6d6
| 317485 ||  || — || September 15, 2002 || Palomar || NEAT || — || align=right | 2.5 km || 
|-id=486 bgcolor=#d6d6d6
| 317486 ||  || — || January 17, 2005 || Kitt Peak || Spacewatch || — || align=right | 4.2 km || 
|-id=487 bgcolor=#fefefe
| 317487 ||  || — || April 9, 2005 || Anderson Mesa || LONEOS || — || align=right | 1.3 km || 
|-id=488 bgcolor=#fefefe
| 317488 ||  || — || September 27, 2002 || Palomar || NEAT || — || align=right data-sort-value="0.98" | 980 m || 
|-id=489 bgcolor=#fefefe
| 317489 ||  || — || September 27, 2002 || Palomar || NEAT || — || align=right | 1.3 km || 
|-id=490 bgcolor=#d6d6d6
| 317490 ||  || — || September 27, 2002 || Palomar || NEAT || THM || align=right | 3.0 km || 
|-id=491 bgcolor=#fefefe
| 317491 ||  || — || September 27, 2002 || Palomar || NEAT || — || align=right | 1.1 km || 
|-id=492 bgcolor=#E9E9E9
| 317492 ||  || — || September 26, 2002 || Palomar || NEAT || — || align=right | 1.2 km || 
|-id=493 bgcolor=#fefefe
| 317493 ||  || — || September 29, 2002 || Haleakala || NEAT || PHO || align=right | 1.5 km || 
|-id=494 bgcolor=#d6d6d6
| 317494 ||  || — || September 30, 2002 || Socorro || LINEAR || — || align=right | 7.7 km || 
|-id=495 bgcolor=#fefefe
| 317495 ||  || — || September 17, 2002 || Haleakala || NEAT || — || align=right data-sort-value="0.81" | 810 m || 
|-id=496 bgcolor=#fefefe
| 317496 ||  || — || September 17, 2002 || Palomar || NEAT || FLO || align=right data-sort-value="0.74" | 740 m || 
|-id=497 bgcolor=#E9E9E9
| 317497 ||  || — || September 26, 2002 || Palomar || NEAT || — || align=right data-sort-value="0.86" | 860 m || 
|-id=498 bgcolor=#d6d6d6
| 317498 ||  || — || September 26, 2002 || Palomar || NEAT || — || align=right | 2.9 km || 
|-id=499 bgcolor=#E9E9E9
| 317499 ||  || — || October 1, 2002 || Anderson Mesa || LONEOS || — || align=right | 1.3 km || 
|-id=500 bgcolor=#E9E9E9
| 317500 ||  || — || October 1, 2002 || Anderson Mesa || LONEOS || — || align=right | 1.1 km || 
|}

317501–317600 

|-bgcolor=#E9E9E9
| 317501 ||  || — || October 1, 2002 || Anderson Mesa || LONEOS || — || align=right | 1.2 km || 
|-id=502 bgcolor=#fefefe
| 317502 ||  || — || October 1, 2002 || Socorro || LINEAR || — || align=right | 1.1 km || 
|-id=503 bgcolor=#fefefe
| 317503 ||  || — || October 2, 2002 || Socorro || LINEAR || H || align=right data-sort-value="0.84" | 840 m || 
|-id=504 bgcolor=#fefefe
| 317504 ||  || — || October 2, 2002 || Socorro || LINEAR || — || align=right | 1.2 km || 
|-id=505 bgcolor=#fefefe
| 317505 ||  || — || October 2, 2002 || Socorro || LINEAR || MAS || align=right data-sort-value="0.99" | 990 m || 
|-id=506 bgcolor=#fefefe
| 317506 ||  || — || October 2, 2002 || Socorro || LINEAR || — || align=right | 1.2 km || 
|-id=507 bgcolor=#fefefe
| 317507 ||  || — || October 2, 2002 || Socorro || LINEAR || — || align=right | 1.2 km || 
|-id=508 bgcolor=#fefefe
| 317508 ||  || — || October 2, 2002 || Socorro || LINEAR || H || align=right data-sort-value="0.90" | 900 m || 
|-id=509 bgcolor=#fefefe
| 317509 ||  || — || October 2, 2002 || Socorro || LINEAR || — || align=right data-sort-value="0.88" | 880 m || 
|-id=510 bgcolor=#E9E9E9
| 317510 ||  || — || October 2, 2002 || Socorro || LINEAR || — || align=right | 3.2 km || 
|-id=511 bgcolor=#E9E9E9
| 317511 ||  || — || October 5, 2002 || Socorro || LINEAR || — || align=right | 1.7 km || 
|-id=512 bgcolor=#E9E9E9
| 317512 ||  || — || October 3, 2002 || Palomar || NEAT || — || align=right | 1.3 km || 
|-id=513 bgcolor=#fefefe
| 317513 ||  || — || October 3, 2002 || Palomar || NEAT || V || align=right data-sort-value="0.93" | 930 m || 
|-id=514 bgcolor=#E9E9E9
| 317514 ||  || — || October 1, 2002 || Anderson Mesa || LONEOS || — || align=right | 2.1 km || 
|-id=515 bgcolor=#fefefe
| 317515 ||  || — || October 1, 2002 || Haleakala || NEAT || — || align=right | 1.4 km || 
|-id=516 bgcolor=#fefefe
| 317516 ||  || — || October 3, 2002 || Socorro || LINEAR || — || align=right data-sort-value="0.94" | 940 m || 
|-id=517 bgcolor=#E9E9E9
| 317517 ||  || — || October 4, 2002 || Socorro || LINEAR || — || align=right | 1.0 km || 
|-id=518 bgcolor=#E9E9E9
| 317518 ||  || — || October 4, 2002 || Palomar || NEAT || — || align=right | 2.5 km || 
|-id=519 bgcolor=#fefefe
| 317519 ||  || — || October 4, 2002 || Socorro || LINEAR || V || align=right data-sort-value="0.92" | 920 m || 
|-id=520 bgcolor=#d6d6d6
| 317520 ||  || — || October 4, 2002 || Palomar || NEAT || EOS || align=right | 2.4 km || 
|-id=521 bgcolor=#fefefe
| 317521 ||  || — || October 5, 2002 || Palomar || NEAT || — || align=right | 1.3 km || 
|-id=522 bgcolor=#E9E9E9
| 317522 ||  || — || October 5, 2002 || Palomar || NEAT || JUN || align=right | 1.2 km || 
|-id=523 bgcolor=#E9E9E9
| 317523 ||  || — || October 4, 2002 || Socorro || LINEAR || — || align=right | 3.2 km || 
|-id=524 bgcolor=#d6d6d6
| 317524 ||  || — || October 4, 2002 || Socorro || LINEAR || 7:4 || align=right | 3.8 km || 
|-id=525 bgcolor=#fefefe
| 317525 ||  || — || October 4, 2002 || Socorro || LINEAR || — || align=right | 1.0 km || 
|-id=526 bgcolor=#fefefe
| 317526 ||  || — || October 4, 2002 || Socorro || LINEAR || ERI || align=right | 1.9 km || 
|-id=527 bgcolor=#E9E9E9
| 317527 ||  || — || October 8, 2002 || Anderson Mesa || LONEOS || — || align=right | 2.2 km || 
|-id=528 bgcolor=#d6d6d6
| 317528 ||  || — || October 6, 2002 || Socorro || LINEAR || — || align=right | 5.5 km || 
|-id=529 bgcolor=#fefefe
| 317529 ||  || — || October 9, 2002 || Socorro || LINEAR || — || align=right | 1.3 km || 
|-id=530 bgcolor=#E9E9E9
| 317530 ||  || — || October 9, 2002 || Socorro || LINEAR || — || align=right | 1.1 km || 
|-id=531 bgcolor=#fefefe
| 317531 ||  || — || October 10, 2002 || Socorro || LINEAR || FLO || align=right data-sort-value="0.69" | 690 m || 
|-id=532 bgcolor=#E9E9E9
| 317532 ||  || — || October 10, 2002 || Socorro || LINEAR || BAR || align=right | 1.8 km || 
|-id=533 bgcolor=#E9E9E9
| 317533 ||  || — || October 4, 2002 || Apache Point || SDSS || — || align=right | 1.4 km || 
|-id=534 bgcolor=#E9E9E9
| 317534 ||  || — || October 4, 2002 || Apache Point || SDSS || — || align=right | 2.7 km || 
|-id=535 bgcolor=#E9E9E9
| 317535 ||  || — || October 4, 2002 || Apache Point || SDSS || RAF || align=right | 1.0 km || 
|-id=536 bgcolor=#E9E9E9
| 317536 ||  || — || October 5, 2002 || Apache Point || SDSS || — || align=right data-sort-value="0.78" | 780 m || 
|-id=537 bgcolor=#E9E9E9
| 317537 ||  || — || October 5, 2002 || Apache Point || SDSS || — || align=right | 2.5 km || 
|-id=538 bgcolor=#d6d6d6
| 317538 ||  || — || October 10, 2002 || Apache Point || SDSS || — || align=right | 4.0 km || 
|-id=539 bgcolor=#fefefe
| 317539 ||  || — || October 10, 2002 || Apache Point || SDSS || V || align=right data-sort-value="0.61" | 610 m || 
|-id=540 bgcolor=#fefefe
| 317540 ||  || — || October 10, 2002 || Apache Point || SDSS || — || align=right | 1.0 km || 
|-id=541 bgcolor=#E9E9E9
| 317541 ||  || — || October 16, 2002 || Palomar || NEAT || — || align=right | 2.5 km || 
|-id=542 bgcolor=#d6d6d6
| 317542 ||  || — || October 28, 2002 || Socorro || LINEAR || PAL || align=right | 4.8 km || 
|-id=543 bgcolor=#fefefe
| 317543 ||  || — || October 26, 2002 || Haleakala || NEAT || — || align=right | 1.2 km || 
|-id=544 bgcolor=#fefefe
| 317544 ||  || — || October 28, 2002 || Palomar || NEAT || — || align=right | 1.3 km || 
|-id=545 bgcolor=#fefefe
| 317545 ||  || — || October 30, 2002 || Haleakala || NEAT || H || align=right | 1.3 km || 
|-id=546 bgcolor=#E9E9E9
| 317546 ||  || — || October 30, 2002 || Socorro || LINEAR || — || align=right | 1.1 km || 
|-id=547 bgcolor=#d6d6d6
| 317547 ||  || — || October 30, 2002 || Kitt Peak || Spacewatch || — || align=right | 4.1 km || 
|-id=548 bgcolor=#fefefe
| 317548 ||  || — || October 30, 2002 || Kitt Peak || Spacewatch || — || align=right data-sort-value="0.81" | 810 m || 
|-id=549 bgcolor=#E9E9E9
| 317549 ||  || — || October 30, 2002 || Palomar || NEAT || — || align=right | 1.2 km || 
|-id=550 bgcolor=#d6d6d6
| 317550 ||  || — || October 31, 2002 || Palomar || NEAT || THM || align=right | 2.7 km || 
|-id=551 bgcolor=#E9E9E9
| 317551 ||  || — || October 31, 2002 || Socorro || LINEAR || — || align=right | 3.6 km || 
|-id=552 bgcolor=#d6d6d6
| 317552 ||  || — || October 31, 2002 || Palomar || NEAT || — || align=right | 5.9 km || 
|-id=553 bgcolor=#d6d6d6
| 317553 ||  || — || October 31, 2002 || Socorro || LINEAR || — || align=right | 4.5 km || 
|-id=554 bgcolor=#E9E9E9
| 317554 ||  || — || October 29, 2002 || Apache Point || SDSS || KON || align=right | 3.1 km || 
|-id=555 bgcolor=#d6d6d6
| 317555 ||  || — || October 30, 2002 || Palomar || NEAT || — || align=right | 3.7 km || 
|-id=556 bgcolor=#d6d6d6
| 317556 ||  || — || October 31, 2002 || Palomar || NEAT || KAR || align=right | 1.4 km || 
|-id=557 bgcolor=#E9E9E9
| 317557 ||  || — || November 1, 2002 || Palomar || NEAT || EUN || align=right | 1.7 km || 
|-id=558 bgcolor=#E9E9E9
| 317558 ||  || — || November 4, 2002 || Palomar || NEAT || — || align=right | 1.0 km || 
|-id=559 bgcolor=#E9E9E9
| 317559 ||  || — || November 4, 2002 || Palomar || NEAT || — || align=right | 1.8 km || 
|-id=560 bgcolor=#fefefe
| 317560 ||  || — || November 4, 2002 || Palomar || NEAT || FLO || align=right data-sort-value="0.79" | 790 m || 
|-id=561 bgcolor=#E9E9E9
| 317561 ||  || — || November 5, 2002 || Anderson Mesa || LONEOS || — || align=right | 1.8 km || 
|-id=562 bgcolor=#E9E9E9
| 317562 ||  || — || November 5, 2002 || Palomar || NEAT || — || align=right | 1.5 km || 
|-id=563 bgcolor=#E9E9E9
| 317563 ||  || — || November 5, 2002 || Socorro || LINEAR || MAR || align=right | 1.4 km || 
|-id=564 bgcolor=#fefefe
| 317564 ||  || — || November 7, 2002 || Socorro || LINEAR || MAS || align=right | 1.3 km || 
|-id=565 bgcolor=#fefefe
| 317565 ||  || — || November 7, 2002 || Socorro || LINEAR || — || align=right | 1.1 km || 
|-id=566 bgcolor=#E9E9E9
| 317566 ||  || — || November 12, 2002 || Socorro || LINEAR || — || align=right | 1.5 km || 
|-id=567 bgcolor=#E9E9E9
| 317567 ||  || — || November 12, 2002 || Socorro || LINEAR || — || align=right | 1.4 km || 
|-id=568 bgcolor=#fefefe
| 317568 ||  || — || November 13, 2002 || Palomar || NEAT || MAS || align=right data-sort-value="0.89" | 890 m || 
|-id=569 bgcolor=#E9E9E9
| 317569 ||  || — || November 11, 2002 || Socorro || LINEAR || — || align=right | 1.3 km || 
|-id=570 bgcolor=#E9E9E9
| 317570 ||  || — || November 12, 2002 || Anderson Mesa || LONEOS || GER || align=right | 2.2 km || 
|-id=571 bgcolor=#E9E9E9
| 317571 ||  || — || November 12, 2002 || Socorro || LINEAR || — || align=right | 1.4 km || 
|-id=572 bgcolor=#E9E9E9
| 317572 ||  || — || November 13, 2002 || Palomar || NEAT || EUN || align=right | 2.8 km || 
|-id=573 bgcolor=#d6d6d6
| 317573 ||  || — || November 13, 2002 || Palomar || NEAT || — || align=right | 5.0 km || 
|-id=574 bgcolor=#fefefe
| 317574 ||  || — || November 11, 2002 || Palomar || NEAT || FLO || align=right | 1.7 km || 
|-id=575 bgcolor=#fefefe
| 317575 ||  || — || November 14, 2002 || Palomar || NEAT || — || align=right data-sort-value="0.99" | 990 m || 
|-id=576 bgcolor=#d6d6d6
| 317576 ||  || — || November 15, 2002 || Palomar || NEAT || 7:4 || align=right | 5.9 km || 
|-id=577 bgcolor=#E9E9E9
| 317577 ||  || — || November 4, 2002 || Palomar || NEAT || — || align=right | 2.5 km || 
|-id=578 bgcolor=#d6d6d6
| 317578 ||  || — || November 4, 2002 || Palomar || NEAT || — || align=right | 2.9 km || 
|-id=579 bgcolor=#E9E9E9
| 317579 ||  || — || November 27, 2002 || Anderson Mesa || LONEOS || — || align=right | 2.5 km || 
|-id=580 bgcolor=#E9E9E9
| 317580 ||  || — || November 28, 2002 || Anderson Mesa || LONEOS || — || align=right | 1.4 km || 
|-id=581 bgcolor=#fefefe
| 317581 ||  || — || November 28, 2002 || Anderson Mesa || LONEOS || ERI || align=right | 1.7 km || 
|-id=582 bgcolor=#fefefe
| 317582 ||  || — || November 28, 2002 || Anderson Mesa || LONEOS || V || align=right | 1.0 km || 
|-id=583 bgcolor=#fefefe
| 317583 ||  || — || November 24, 2002 || Palomar || S. F. Hönig || — || align=right data-sort-value="0.68" | 680 m || 
|-id=584 bgcolor=#E9E9E9
| 317584 ||  || — || November 16, 2002 || Palomar || NEAT || — || align=right | 1.1 km || 
|-id=585 bgcolor=#d6d6d6
| 317585 ||  || — || November 24, 2002 || Palomar || NEAT || — || align=right | 4.1 km || 
|-id=586 bgcolor=#E9E9E9
| 317586 ||  || — || December 2, 2002 || Socorro || LINEAR || — || align=right | 1.7 km || 
|-id=587 bgcolor=#E9E9E9
| 317587 ||  || — || December 3, 2002 || Palomar || NEAT || — || align=right | 1.7 km || 
|-id=588 bgcolor=#E9E9E9
| 317588 ||  || — || December 3, 2002 || Palomar || NEAT || — || align=right | 1.1 km || 
|-id=589 bgcolor=#E9E9E9
| 317589 ||  || — || December 2, 2002 || Socorro || LINEAR || — || align=right | 1.5 km || 
|-id=590 bgcolor=#fefefe
| 317590 ||  || — || December 2, 2002 || Socorro || LINEAR || — || align=right | 1.5 km || 
|-id=591 bgcolor=#E9E9E9
| 317591 ||  || — || December 5, 2002 || Socorro || LINEAR || ADE || align=right | 2.6 km || 
|-id=592 bgcolor=#E9E9E9
| 317592 ||  || — || December 5, 2002 || Fountain Hills || Fountain Hills Obs. || — || align=right | 2.8 km || 
|-id=593 bgcolor=#E9E9E9
| 317593 ||  || — || December 6, 2002 || Socorro || LINEAR || — || align=right | 1.9 km || 
|-id=594 bgcolor=#E9E9E9
| 317594 ||  || — || December 9, 2002 || Kitt Peak || Spacewatch || — || align=right | 1.2 km || 
|-id=595 bgcolor=#E9E9E9
| 317595 ||  || — || December 9, 2002 || Desert Eagle || W. K. Y. Yeung || — || align=right | 1.7 km || 
|-id=596 bgcolor=#d6d6d6
| 317596 ||  || — || December 9, 2002 || Desert Eagle || W. K. Y. Yeung || — || align=right | 5.0 km || 
|-id=597 bgcolor=#E9E9E9
| 317597 ||  || — || December 7, 2002 || Socorro || LINEAR || — || align=right | 2.2 km || 
|-id=598 bgcolor=#E9E9E9
| 317598 ||  || — || December 10, 2002 || Socorro || LINEAR || — || align=right | 1.8 km || 
|-id=599 bgcolor=#E9E9E9
| 317599 ||  || — || December 13, 2002 || Socorro || LINEAR || — || align=right | 3.8 km || 
|-id=600 bgcolor=#E9E9E9
| 317600 ||  || — || December 11, 2002 || Socorro || LINEAR || — || align=right | 1.3 km || 
|}

317601–317700 

|-bgcolor=#E9E9E9
| 317601 ||  || — || December 11, 2002 || Socorro || LINEAR || — || align=right | 1.5 km || 
|-id=602 bgcolor=#E9E9E9
| 317602 ||  || — || December 2, 2002 || Socorro || LINEAR || — || align=right | 1.0 km || 
|-id=603 bgcolor=#E9E9E9
| 317603 ||  || — || December 6, 2002 || Socorro || LINEAR || HNA || align=right | 2.8 km || 
|-id=604 bgcolor=#E9E9E9
| 317604 ||  || — || December 11, 2002 || Socorro || LINEAR || — || align=right | 2.0 km || 
|-id=605 bgcolor=#E9E9E9
| 317605 ||  || — || December 31, 2002 || Socorro || LINEAR || MIT || align=right | 2.8 km || 
|-id=606 bgcolor=#fefefe
| 317606 ||  || — || December 31, 2002 || Socorro || LINEAR || — || align=right | 1.2 km || 
|-id=607 bgcolor=#E9E9E9
| 317607 ||  || — || December 31, 2002 || Socorro || LINEAR || — || align=right | 2.1 km || 
|-id=608 bgcolor=#E9E9E9
| 317608 ||  || — || January 2, 2003 || Socorro || LINEAR || — || align=right | 1.8 km || 
|-id=609 bgcolor=#fefefe
| 317609 ||  || — || January 3, 2003 || Socorro || LINEAR || — || align=right | 1.2 km || 
|-id=610 bgcolor=#E9E9E9
| 317610 ||  || — || January 5, 2003 || Socorro || LINEAR || — || align=right | 3.3 km || 
|-id=611 bgcolor=#d6d6d6
| 317611 ||  || — || January 7, 2003 || Socorro || LINEAR || — || align=right | 4.9 km || 
|-id=612 bgcolor=#E9E9E9
| 317612 ||  || — || January 5, 2003 || Socorro || LINEAR || — || align=right | 2.5 km || 
|-id=613 bgcolor=#E9E9E9
| 317613 ||  || — || January 5, 2003 || Socorro || LINEAR || — || align=right | 1.7 km || 
|-id=614 bgcolor=#E9E9E9
| 317614 ||  || — || January 5, 2003 || Socorro || LINEAR || — || align=right | 2.3 km || 
|-id=615 bgcolor=#E9E9E9
| 317615 ||  || — || January 5, 2003 || Socorro || LINEAR || JUN || align=right | 1.7 km || 
|-id=616 bgcolor=#E9E9E9
| 317616 ||  || — || January 9, 2003 || Socorro || LINEAR || ADE || align=right | 2.9 km || 
|-id=617 bgcolor=#E9E9E9
| 317617 ||  || — || January 11, 2003 || Socorro || LINEAR || — || align=right | 1.8 km || 
|-id=618 bgcolor=#E9E9E9
| 317618 ||  || — || January 26, 2003 || Haleakala || NEAT || — || align=right | 1.4 km || 
|-id=619 bgcolor=#E9E9E9
| 317619 ||  || — || January 26, 2003 || Haleakala || NEAT || — || align=right | 2.7 km || 
|-id=620 bgcolor=#E9E9E9
| 317620 ||  || — || January 27, 2003 || Socorro || LINEAR || — || align=right | 2.5 km || 
|-id=621 bgcolor=#fefefe
| 317621 ||  || — || January 27, 2003 || Palomar || NEAT || — || align=right | 1.1 km || 
|-id=622 bgcolor=#E9E9E9
| 317622 ||  || — || January 27, 2003 || Haleakala || NEAT || — || align=right | 1.5 km || 
|-id=623 bgcolor=#d6d6d6
| 317623 ||  || — || January 29, 2003 || Kitt Peak || Spacewatch || — || align=right | 3.2 km || 
|-id=624 bgcolor=#d6d6d6
| 317624 ||  || — || January 29, 2003 || Palomar || NEAT || — || align=right | 3.5 km || 
|-id=625 bgcolor=#E9E9E9
| 317625 ||  || — || January 29, 2003 || Palomar || NEAT || — || align=right | 2.0 km || 
|-id=626 bgcolor=#E9E9E9
| 317626 ||  || — || January 29, 2003 || Palomar || NEAT || JUN || align=right | 1.5 km || 
|-id=627 bgcolor=#E9E9E9
| 317627 ||  || — || January 31, 2003 || Palomar || NEAT || — || align=right | 1.4 km || 
|-id=628 bgcolor=#E9E9E9
| 317628 ||  || — || January 31, 2003 || Socorro || LINEAR || DOR || align=right | 2.7 km || 
|-id=629 bgcolor=#E9E9E9
| 317629 ||  || — || February 2, 2003 || Socorro || LINEAR || EUN || align=right | 1.8 km || 
|-id=630 bgcolor=#E9E9E9
| 317630 ||  || — || February 4, 2003 || Anderson Mesa || LONEOS || — || align=right | 2.0 km || 
|-id=631 bgcolor=#E9E9E9
| 317631 ||  || — || February 11, 2003 || La Silla || R. Michelsen, G. Masi || — || align=right | 2.5 km || 
|-id=632 bgcolor=#E9E9E9
| 317632 ||  || — || February 9, 2003 || Palomar || NEAT || — || align=right | 3.4 km || 
|-id=633 bgcolor=#E9E9E9
| 317633 ||  || — || February 13, 2003 || La Silla || R. Michelsen, G. Masi || MRX || align=right | 1.1 km || 
|-id=634 bgcolor=#E9E9E9
| 317634 ||  || — || February 2, 2003 || Anderson Mesa || LONEOS || — || align=right | 3.2 km || 
|-id=635 bgcolor=#E9E9E9
| 317635 ||  || — || February 22, 2003 || Palomar || NEAT || — || align=right | 2.8 km || 
|-id=636 bgcolor=#E9E9E9
| 317636 ||  || — || February 24, 2003 || Campo Imperatore || CINEOS || EUN || align=right | 1.8 km || 
|-id=637 bgcolor=#E9E9E9
| 317637 ||  || — || March 5, 2003 || Socorro || LINEAR || — || align=right | 2.2 km || 
|-id=638 bgcolor=#FA8072
| 317638 ||  || — || March 6, 2003 || Socorro || LINEAR || — || align=right | 2.2 km || 
|-id=639 bgcolor=#E9E9E9
| 317639 ||  || — || March 6, 2003 || Socorro || LINEAR || — || align=right | 3.3 km || 
|-id=640 bgcolor=#fefefe
| 317640 ||  || — || March 6, 2003 || Socorro || LINEAR || MAS || align=right | 1.0 km || 
|-id=641 bgcolor=#E9E9E9
| 317641 ||  || — || March 6, 2003 || Palomar || NEAT || ADE || align=right | 2.3 km || 
|-id=642 bgcolor=#E9E9E9
| 317642 ||  || — || March 8, 2003 || Palomar || NEAT || — || align=right | 3.7 km || 
|-id=643 bgcolor=#FFC2E0
| 317643 ||  || — || March 24, 2003 || Socorro || LINEAR || APO +1km || align=right data-sort-value="0.79" | 790 m || 
|-id=644 bgcolor=#E9E9E9
| 317644 ||  || — || March 24, 2003 || Kitt Peak || Spacewatch || AER || align=right | 1.3 km || 
|-id=645 bgcolor=#E9E9E9
| 317645 ||  || — || March 23, 2003 || Kitt Peak || Spacewatch || — || align=right | 2.5 km || 
|-id=646 bgcolor=#fefefe
| 317646 ||  || — || March 25, 2003 || Kitt Peak || Spacewatch || NYS || align=right data-sort-value="0.87" | 870 m || 
|-id=647 bgcolor=#E9E9E9
| 317647 ||  || — || March 24, 2003 || Kitt Peak || Spacewatch || — || align=right | 2.6 km || 
|-id=648 bgcolor=#E9E9E9
| 317648 ||  || — || March 25, 2003 || Haleakala || NEAT || MRX || align=right | 1.6 km || 
|-id=649 bgcolor=#fefefe
| 317649 ||  || — || March 23, 2003 || Kitt Peak || Spacewatch || — || align=right data-sort-value="0.94" | 940 m || 
|-id=650 bgcolor=#E9E9E9
| 317650 ||  || — || March 24, 2003 || Kitt Peak || Spacewatch || — || align=right | 3.1 km || 
|-id=651 bgcolor=#E9E9E9
| 317651 ||  || — || March 26, 2003 || Palomar || NEAT || CLO || align=right | 3.2 km || 
|-id=652 bgcolor=#fefefe
| 317652 ||  || — || March 26, 2003 || Palomar || NEAT || — || align=right | 1.1 km || 
|-id=653 bgcolor=#E9E9E9
| 317653 ||  || — || March 27, 2003 || Palomar || NEAT || — || align=right | 2.3 km || 
|-id=654 bgcolor=#E9E9E9
| 317654 ||  || — || March 27, 2003 || Palomar || NEAT || POS || align=right | 3.8 km || 
|-id=655 bgcolor=#E9E9E9
| 317655 ||  || — || March 28, 2003 || Anderson Mesa || LONEOS || — || align=right | 3.5 km || 
|-id=656 bgcolor=#d6d6d6
| 317656 ||  || — || March 26, 2003 || Palomar || NEAT || — || align=right | 2.6 km || 
|-id=657 bgcolor=#E9E9E9
| 317657 ||  || — || March 27, 2003 || Anderson Mesa || LONEOS || 526 || align=right | 2.8 km || 
|-id=658 bgcolor=#fefefe
| 317658 ||  || — || March 31, 2003 || Kitt Peak || Spacewatch || — || align=right data-sort-value="0.77" | 770 m || 
|-id=659 bgcolor=#E9E9E9
| 317659 ||  || — || March 7, 2003 || Anderson Mesa || LONEOS || — || align=right | 2.8 km || 
|-id=660 bgcolor=#E9E9E9
| 317660 ||  || — || March 26, 2003 || Anderson Mesa || LONEOS || DOR || align=right | 3.0 km || 
|-id=661 bgcolor=#E9E9E9
| 317661 ||  || — || March 24, 2003 || Kitt Peak || Spacewatch || — || align=right | 1.3 km || 
|-id=662 bgcolor=#d6d6d6
| 317662 ||  || — || March 31, 2003 || Cerro Tololo || DLS || — || align=right | 3.5 km || 
|-id=663 bgcolor=#E9E9E9
| 317663 ||  || — || March 30, 2003 || Kitt Peak || M. W. Buie || AEO || align=right | 1.5 km || 
|-id=664 bgcolor=#E9E9E9
| 317664 ||  || — || March 24, 2003 || Haleakala || NEAT || ADE || align=right | 3.0 km || 
|-id=665 bgcolor=#E9E9E9
| 317665 ||  || — || April 2, 2003 || Haleakala || NEAT || — || align=right | 1.6 km || 
|-id=666 bgcolor=#E9E9E9
| 317666 ||  || — || April 4, 2003 || Kitt Peak || Spacewatch || GEF || align=right | 1.4 km || 
|-id=667 bgcolor=#E9E9E9
| 317667 ||  || — || April 4, 2003 || Kitt Peak || Spacewatch || AGN || align=right | 1.2 km || 
|-id=668 bgcolor=#C2FFFF
| 317668 ||  || — || April 8, 2003 || Kitt Peak || Spacewatch || L4 || align=right | 11 km || 
|-id=669 bgcolor=#fefefe
| 317669 ||  || — || April 24, 2003 || Anderson Mesa || LONEOS || NYS || align=right data-sort-value="0.76" | 760 m || 
|-id=670 bgcolor=#fefefe
| 317670 ||  || — || April 25, 2003 || Campo Imperatore || CINEOS || — || align=right data-sort-value="0.83" | 830 m || 
|-id=671 bgcolor=#E9E9E9
| 317671 ||  || — || April 26, 2003 || Kitt Peak || Spacewatch || — || align=right | 2.7 km || 
|-id=672 bgcolor=#E9E9E9
| 317672 ||  || — || April 29, 2003 || Socorro || LINEAR || TIN || align=right | 1.7 km || 
|-id=673 bgcolor=#E9E9E9
| 317673 ||  || — || April 30, 2003 || Socorro || LINEAR || — || align=right | 3.8 km || 
|-id=674 bgcolor=#E9E9E9
| 317674 ||  || — || April 30, 2003 || Haleakala || NEAT || — || align=right | 3.6 km || 
|-id=675 bgcolor=#fefefe
| 317675 ||  || — || April 29, 2003 || Kitt Peak || Spacewatch || MAS || align=right data-sort-value="0.93" | 930 m || 
|-id=676 bgcolor=#E9E9E9
| 317676 ||  || — || May 1, 2003 || Kitt Peak || Spacewatch || WIT || align=right | 1.2 km || 
|-id=677 bgcolor=#fefefe
| 317677 ||  || — || May 1, 2003 || Socorro || LINEAR || — || align=right data-sort-value="0.97" | 970 m || 
|-id=678 bgcolor=#fefefe
| 317678 ||  || — || May 1, 2003 || Kitt Peak || Spacewatch || V || align=right data-sort-value="0.72" | 720 m || 
|-id=679 bgcolor=#E9E9E9
| 317679 ||  || — || May 20, 2003 || Reedy Creek || J. Broughton || — || align=right | 3.9 km || 
|-id=680 bgcolor=#fefefe
| 317680 ||  || — || May 22, 2003 || Reedy Creek || J. Broughton || — || align=right | 1.3 km || 
|-id=681 bgcolor=#d6d6d6
| 317681 ||  || — || May 25, 2003 || Kitt Peak || Spacewatch || — || align=right | 5.5 km || 
|-id=682 bgcolor=#E9E9E9
| 317682 ||  || — || May 27, 2003 || Kitt Peak || Spacewatch || — || align=right | 1.8 km || 
|-id=683 bgcolor=#FA8072
| 317683 ||  || — || June 22, 2003 || Anderson Mesa || LONEOS || — || align=right | 1.0 km || 
|-id=684 bgcolor=#d6d6d6
| 317684 ||  || — || June 26, 2003 || Socorro || LINEAR || — || align=right | 4.0 km || 
|-id=685 bgcolor=#FFC2E0
| 317685 ||  || — || July 5, 2003 || Socorro || LINEAR || AMO +1km || align=right data-sort-value="0.80" | 800 m || 
|-id=686 bgcolor=#fefefe
| 317686 ||  || — || July 3, 2003 || Kitt Peak || Spacewatch || — || align=right data-sort-value="0.73" | 730 m || 
|-id=687 bgcolor=#d6d6d6
| 317687 ||  || — || July 22, 2003 || Haleakala || NEAT || — || align=right | 5.2 km || 
|-id=688 bgcolor=#d6d6d6
| 317688 ||  || — || July 25, 2003 || Reedy Creek || J. Broughton || — || align=right | 4.3 km || 
|-id=689 bgcolor=#d6d6d6
| 317689 ||  || — || July 22, 2003 || Palomar || NEAT || — || align=right | 6.2 km || 
|-id=690 bgcolor=#d6d6d6
| 317690 ||  || — || July 28, 2003 || Campo Imperatore || CINEOS || EOS || align=right | 2.8 km || 
|-id=691 bgcolor=#fefefe
| 317691 ||  || — || July 31, 2003 || Campo Imperatore || CINEOS || FLO || align=right data-sort-value="0.97" | 970 m || 
|-id=692 bgcolor=#fefefe
| 317692 ||  || — || July 24, 2003 || Palomar || NEAT || PHO || align=right | 1.4 km || 
|-id=693 bgcolor=#fefefe
| 317693 ||  || — || July 24, 2003 || Palomar || NEAT || FLO || align=right data-sort-value="0.52" | 520 m || 
|-id=694 bgcolor=#d6d6d6
| 317694 ||  || — || July 24, 2003 || Palomar || NEAT || — || align=right | 2.9 km || 
|-id=695 bgcolor=#fefefe
| 317695 ||  || — || July 24, 2003 || Palomar || NEAT || — || align=right data-sort-value="0.94" | 940 m || 
|-id=696 bgcolor=#fefefe
| 317696 ||  || — || August 4, 2003 || Socorro || LINEAR || — || align=right data-sort-value="0.94" | 940 m || 
|-id=697 bgcolor=#fefefe
| 317697 ||  || — || August 1, 2003 || Socorro || LINEAR || — || align=right | 1.1 km || 
|-id=698 bgcolor=#fefefe
| 317698 ||  || — || August 1, 2003 || Socorro || LINEAR || — || align=right | 1.2 km || 
|-id=699 bgcolor=#FA8072
| 317699 ||  || — || August 1, 2003 || Socorro || LINEAR || — || align=right data-sort-value="0.80" | 800 m || 
|-id=700 bgcolor=#d6d6d6
| 317700 || 2003 QY || — || August 19, 2003 || Pla D'Arguines || Pla D'Arguines Obs. || — || align=right | 2.9 km || 
|}

317701–317800 

|-bgcolor=#d6d6d6
| 317701 ||  || — || August 19, 2003 || Campo Imperatore || CINEOS || EOS || align=right | 2.3 km || 
|-id=702 bgcolor=#fefefe
| 317702 ||  || — || August 17, 2003 || Wise || D. Polishook || ERI || align=right | 1.5 km || 
|-id=703 bgcolor=#d6d6d6
| 317703 ||  || — || August 20, 2003 || Palomar || NEAT || — || align=right | 4.5 km || 
|-id=704 bgcolor=#fefefe
| 317704 ||  || — || August 20, 2003 || Palomar || NEAT || V || align=right data-sort-value="0.78" | 780 m || 
|-id=705 bgcolor=#d6d6d6
| 317705 ||  || — || August 20, 2003 || Campo Imperatore || CINEOS || — || align=right | 3.2 km || 
|-id=706 bgcolor=#fefefe
| 317706 ||  || — || August 20, 2003 || Palomar || NEAT || V || align=right data-sort-value="0.83" | 830 m || 
|-id=707 bgcolor=#fefefe
| 317707 ||  || — || August 22, 2003 || Palomar || NEAT || — || align=right | 2.5 km || 
|-id=708 bgcolor=#d6d6d6
| 317708 ||  || — || August 22, 2003 || Haleakala || NEAT || — || align=right | 4.5 km || 
|-id=709 bgcolor=#d6d6d6
| 317709 ||  || — || August 22, 2003 || Palomar || NEAT || VER || align=right | 3.8 km || 
|-id=710 bgcolor=#d6d6d6
| 317710 ||  || — || August 22, 2003 || Palomar || NEAT || EOS || align=right | 2.7 km || 
|-id=711 bgcolor=#d6d6d6
| 317711 ||  || — || August 22, 2003 || Haleakala || NEAT || — || align=right | 4.0 km || 
|-id=712 bgcolor=#fefefe
| 317712 ||  || — || August 22, 2003 || Haleakala || NEAT || FLO || align=right data-sort-value="0.87" | 870 m || 
|-id=713 bgcolor=#fefefe
| 317713 ||  || — || August 21, 2003 || Campo Imperatore || CINEOS || FLO || align=right data-sort-value="0.84" | 840 m || 
|-id=714 bgcolor=#fefefe
| 317714 ||  || — || August 22, 2003 || Palomar || NEAT || FLO || align=right | 1.2 km || 
|-id=715 bgcolor=#d6d6d6
| 317715 Guydetienne ||  ||  || August 24, 2003 || Saint-Sulpice || Saint-Sulpice Obs. || — || align=right | 3.3 km || 
|-id=716 bgcolor=#fefefe
| 317716 ||  || — || August 21, 2003 || Palomar || NEAT || — || align=right | 1.0 km || 
|-id=717 bgcolor=#d6d6d6
| 317717 ||  || — || August 21, 2003 || Campo Imperatore || CINEOS || — || align=right | 4.4 km || 
|-id=718 bgcolor=#fefefe
| 317718 ||  || — || August 22, 2003 || Socorro || LINEAR || — || align=right | 1.2 km || 
|-id=719 bgcolor=#fefefe
| 317719 ||  || — || July 26, 2003 || Palomar || NEAT || FLO || align=right data-sort-value="0.66" | 660 m || 
|-id=720 bgcolor=#d6d6d6
| 317720 ||  || — || August 22, 2003 || Socorro || LINEAR || EUP || align=right | 7.0 km || 
|-id=721 bgcolor=#d6d6d6
| 317721 ||  || — || August 22, 2003 || Palomar || NEAT || — || align=right | 3.6 km || 
|-id=722 bgcolor=#d6d6d6
| 317722 ||  || — || August 20, 2003 || Palomar || NEAT || — || align=right | 3.3 km || 
|-id=723 bgcolor=#d6d6d6
| 317723 ||  || — || August 21, 2003 || Palomar || NEAT || — || align=right | 3.9 km || 
|-id=724 bgcolor=#fefefe
| 317724 ||  || — || August 22, 2003 || Palomar || NEAT || — || align=right data-sort-value="0.74" | 740 m || 
|-id=725 bgcolor=#d6d6d6
| 317725 ||  || — || August 23, 2003 || Socorro || LINEAR || — || align=right | 4.0 km || 
|-id=726 bgcolor=#E9E9E9
| 317726 ||  || — || August 24, 2003 || Socorro || LINEAR || — || align=right | 1.5 km || 
|-id=727 bgcolor=#fefefe
| 317727 ||  || — || August 25, 2003 || Cerro Tololo || M. W. Buie || — || align=right data-sort-value="0.72" | 720 m || 
|-id=728 bgcolor=#fefefe
| 317728 ||  || — || August 28, 2003 || Haleakala || NEAT || — || align=right | 1.2 km || 
|-id=729 bgcolor=#d6d6d6
| 317729 ||  || — || August 28, 2003 || Palomar || NEAT || SAN || align=right | 4.3 km || 
|-id=730 bgcolor=#fefefe
| 317730 ||  || — || September 1, 2003 || Socorro || LINEAR || — || align=right data-sort-value="0.92" | 920 m || 
|-id=731 bgcolor=#fefefe
| 317731 ||  || — || September 2, 2003 || Reedy Creek || J. Broughton || — || align=right | 1.2 km || 
|-id=732 bgcolor=#E9E9E9
| 317732 ||  || — || September 15, 2003 || Haleakala || NEAT || — || align=right | 2.4 km || 
|-id=733 bgcolor=#d6d6d6
| 317733 ||  || — || September 13, 2003 || Haleakala || NEAT || — || align=right | 3.6 km || 
|-id=734 bgcolor=#d6d6d6
| 317734 ||  || — || September 15, 2003 || Palomar || NEAT || — || align=right | 4.3 km || 
|-id=735 bgcolor=#fefefe
| 317735 ||  || — || September 16, 2003 || Palomar || NEAT || NYS || align=right | 1.3 km || 
|-id=736 bgcolor=#d6d6d6
| 317736 ||  || — || September 16, 2003 || Kitt Peak || Spacewatch || — || align=right | 4.7 km || 
|-id=737 bgcolor=#d6d6d6
| 317737 ||  || — || September 16, 2003 || Kitt Peak || Spacewatch || — || align=right | 3.2 km || 
|-id=738 bgcolor=#fefefe
| 317738 ||  || — || September 16, 2003 || Palomar || NEAT || — || align=right data-sort-value="0.93" | 930 m || 
|-id=739 bgcolor=#fefefe
| 317739 ||  || — || September 16, 2003 || Kitt Peak || Spacewatch || — || align=right data-sort-value="0.76" | 760 m || 
|-id=740 bgcolor=#E9E9E9
| 317740 ||  || — || September 16, 2003 || Haleakala || NEAT || — || align=right | 2.8 km || 
|-id=741 bgcolor=#d6d6d6
| 317741 ||  || — || September 16, 2003 || Kitt Peak || Spacewatch || TIR || align=right | 4.5 km || 
|-id=742 bgcolor=#d6d6d6
| 317742 ||  || — || September 17, 2003 || Kitt Peak || Spacewatch || — || align=right | 5.3 km || 
|-id=743 bgcolor=#d6d6d6
| 317743 ||  || — || September 18, 2003 || Palomar || NEAT || — || align=right | 4.6 km || 
|-id=744 bgcolor=#d6d6d6
| 317744 ||  || — || September 18, 2003 || Socorro || LINEAR || — || align=right | 4.8 km || 
|-id=745 bgcolor=#fefefe
| 317745 ||  || — || September 16, 2003 || Palomar || NEAT || — || align=right | 1.4 km || 
|-id=746 bgcolor=#d6d6d6
| 317746 ||  || — || September 16, 2003 || Anderson Mesa || LONEOS || — || align=right | 6.2 km || 
|-id=747 bgcolor=#fefefe
| 317747 ||  || — || September 18, 2003 || Palomar || NEAT || — || align=right | 1.1 km || 
|-id=748 bgcolor=#fefefe
| 317748 ||  || — || September 18, 2003 || Palomar || NEAT || V || align=right data-sort-value="0.82" | 820 m || 
|-id=749 bgcolor=#E9E9E9
| 317749 ||  || — || September 16, 2003 || Kitt Peak || Spacewatch || — || align=right | 2.8 km || 
|-id=750 bgcolor=#E9E9E9
| 317750 ||  || — || September 17, 2003 || Anderson Mesa || LONEOS || MAR || align=right | 1.8 km || 
|-id=751 bgcolor=#d6d6d6
| 317751 ||  || — || September 17, 2003 || Anderson Mesa || LONEOS || — || align=right | 4.3 km || 
|-id=752 bgcolor=#d6d6d6
| 317752 ||  || — || September 17, 2003 || Socorro || LINEAR || — || align=right | 5.9 km || 
|-id=753 bgcolor=#fefefe
| 317753 ||  || — || September 17, 2003 || Kitt Peak || Spacewatch || — || align=right data-sort-value="0.96" | 960 m || 
|-id=754 bgcolor=#fefefe
| 317754 ||  || — || September 17, 2003 || Kitt Peak || Spacewatch || — || align=right data-sort-value="0.94" | 940 m || 
|-id=755 bgcolor=#E9E9E9
| 317755 ||  || — || September 18, 2003 || Kitt Peak || Spacewatch || — || align=right | 1.9 km || 
|-id=756 bgcolor=#fefefe
| 317756 ||  || — || September 18, 2003 || Kitt Peak || Spacewatch || NYS || align=right data-sort-value="0.86" | 860 m || 
|-id=757 bgcolor=#fefefe
| 317757 ||  || — || September 18, 2003 || Kitt Peak || Spacewatch || EUT || align=right data-sort-value="0.82" | 820 m || 
|-id=758 bgcolor=#d6d6d6
| 317758 ||  || — || September 19, 2003 || Kitt Peak || Spacewatch || — || align=right | 4.2 km || 
|-id=759 bgcolor=#fefefe
| 317759 ||  || — || September 19, 2003 || Kitt Peak || Spacewatch || FLO || align=right data-sort-value="0.84" | 840 m || 
|-id=760 bgcolor=#fefefe
| 317760 ||  || — || September 19, 2003 || Kitt Peak || Spacewatch || — || align=right | 1.1 km || 
|-id=761 bgcolor=#d6d6d6
| 317761 ||  || — || September 17, 2003 || Kitt Peak || Spacewatch || EUP || align=right | 4.9 km || 
|-id=762 bgcolor=#fefefe
| 317762 ||  || — || September 18, 2003 || Anderson Mesa || LONEOS || — || align=right | 1.1 km || 
|-id=763 bgcolor=#fefefe
| 317763 ||  || — || September 18, 2003 || Palomar || NEAT || — || align=right | 1.2 km || 
|-id=764 bgcolor=#d6d6d6
| 317764 ||  || — || September 18, 2003 || Palomar || NEAT || — || align=right | 4.7 km || 
|-id=765 bgcolor=#fefefe
| 317765 ||  || — || September 18, 2003 || Kitt Peak || Spacewatch || — || align=right | 1.1 km || 
|-id=766 bgcolor=#FA8072
| 317766 ||  || — || September 19, 2003 || Socorro || LINEAR || — || align=right data-sort-value="0.91" | 910 m || 
|-id=767 bgcolor=#d6d6d6
| 317767 ||  || — || September 20, 2003 || Haleakala || NEAT || — || align=right | 4.5 km || 
|-id=768 bgcolor=#fefefe
| 317768 ||  || — || September 20, 2003 || Palomar || NEAT || — || align=right | 1.1 km || 
|-id=769 bgcolor=#d6d6d6
| 317769 ||  || — || September 20, 2003 || Palomar || NEAT || — || align=right | 6.0 km || 
|-id=770 bgcolor=#fefefe
| 317770 ||  || — || September 16, 2003 || Kitt Peak || Spacewatch || — || align=right | 1.0 km || 
|-id=771 bgcolor=#d6d6d6
| 317771 ||  || — || September 16, 2003 || Palomar || NEAT || — || align=right | 5.6 km || 
|-id=772 bgcolor=#d6d6d6
| 317772 ||  || — || September 18, 2003 || Kitt Peak || Spacewatch || KOR || align=right | 1.5 km || 
|-id=773 bgcolor=#fefefe
| 317773 ||  || — || September 19, 2003 || Haleakala || NEAT || — || align=right | 1.1 km || 
|-id=774 bgcolor=#d6d6d6
| 317774 ||  || — || September 20, 2003 || Socorro || LINEAR || — || align=right | 4.1 km || 
|-id=775 bgcolor=#E9E9E9
| 317775 ||  || — || September 20, 2003 || Kitt Peak || Spacewatch || — || align=right | 2.3 km || 
|-id=776 bgcolor=#d6d6d6
| 317776 ||  || — || September 20, 2003 || Socorro || LINEAR || EUP || align=right | 6.0 km || 
|-id=777 bgcolor=#fefefe
| 317777 ||  || — || September 20, 2003 || Socorro || LINEAR || — || align=right | 1.1 km || 
|-id=778 bgcolor=#E9E9E9
| 317778 ||  || — || September 20, 2003 || Socorro || LINEAR || EUN || align=right | 1.9 km || 
|-id=779 bgcolor=#E9E9E9
| 317779 ||  || — || September 18, 2003 || Campo Imperatore || CINEOS || HNA || align=right | 3.6 km || 
|-id=780 bgcolor=#d6d6d6
| 317780 ||  || — || September 21, 2003 || Kitt Peak || Spacewatch || — || align=right | 4.0 km || 
|-id=781 bgcolor=#fefefe
| 317781 ||  || — || September 19, 2003 || Anderson Mesa || LONEOS || FLO || align=right data-sort-value="0.77" | 770 m || 
|-id=782 bgcolor=#d6d6d6
| 317782 ||  || — || September 19, 2003 || Anderson Mesa || LONEOS || — || align=right | 4.7 km || 
|-id=783 bgcolor=#fefefe
| 317783 ||  || — || September 19, 2003 || Anderson Mesa || LONEOS || V || align=right data-sort-value="0.82" | 820 m || 
|-id=784 bgcolor=#fefefe
| 317784 ||  || — || September 17, 2003 || Palomar || NEAT || FLO || align=right data-sort-value="0.76" | 760 m || 
|-id=785 bgcolor=#d6d6d6
| 317785 ||  || — || September 18, 2003 || Kitt Peak || Spacewatch || EOS || align=right | 3.3 km || 
|-id=786 bgcolor=#fefefe
| 317786 ||  || — || September 19, 2003 || Socorro || LINEAR || NYS || align=right data-sort-value="0.80" | 800 m || 
|-id=787 bgcolor=#fefefe
| 317787 ||  || — || September 19, 2003 || Kitt Peak || Spacewatch || NYS || align=right data-sort-value="0.79" | 790 m || 
|-id=788 bgcolor=#fefefe
| 317788 ||  || — || September 20, 2003 || Anderson Mesa || LONEOS || — || align=right | 1.3 km || 
|-id=789 bgcolor=#fefefe
| 317789 ||  || — || September 20, 2003 || Anderson Mesa || LONEOS || — || align=right | 1.1 km || 
|-id=790 bgcolor=#E9E9E9
| 317790 ||  || — || September 18, 2003 || Kitt Peak || Spacewatch || — || align=right | 1.6 km || 
|-id=791 bgcolor=#fefefe
| 317791 ||  || — || September 18, 2003 || Socorro || LINEAR || MAS || align=right data-sort-value="0.95" | 950 m || 
|-id=792 bgcolor=#d6d6d6
| 317792 ||  || — || September 18, 2003 || Palomar || NEAT || — || align=right | 4.3 km || 
|-id=793 bgcolor=#d6d6d6
| 317793 ||  || — || September 18, 2003 || Palomar || NEAT || — || align=right | 3.7 km || 
|-id=794 bgcolor=#fefefe
| 317794 ||  || — || September 19, 2003 || Palomar || NEAT || FLO || align=right data-sort-value="0.83" | 830 m || 
|-id=795 bgcolor=#fefefe
| 317795 ||  || — || September 20, 2003 || Campo Imperatore || CINEOS || V || align=right data-sort-value="0.67" | 670 m || 
|-id=796 bgcolor=#E9E9E9
| 317796 ||  || — || September 20, 2003 || Campo Imperatore || CINEOS || — || align=right | 1.3 km || 
|-id=797 bgcolor=#fefefe
| 317797 ||  || — || September 21, 2003 || Kitt Peak || Spacewatch || — || align=right data-sort-value="0.96" | 960 m || 
|-id=798 bgcolor=#fefefe
| 317798 ||  || — || September 22, 2003 || Anderson Mesa || LONEOS || — || align=right | 1.1 km || 
|-id=799 bgcolor=#E9E9E9
| 317799 ||  || — || September 20, 2003 || Palomar || NEAT || MAR || align=right | 1.5 km || 
|-id=800 bgcolor=#fefefe
| 317800 ||  || — || September 21, 2003 || Anderson Mesa || LONEOS || — || align=right | 1.1 km || 
|}

317801–317900 

|-bgcolor=#d6d6d6
| 317801 ||  || — || September 26, 2003 || Socorro || LINEAR || — || align=right | 4.1 km || 
|-id=802 bgcolor=#fefefe
| 317802 ||  || — || September 26, 2003 || Socorro || LINEAR || ERI || align=right | 1.8 km || 
|-id=803 bgcolor=#fefefe
| 317803 ||  || — || September 26, 2003 || Socorro || LINEAR || — || align=right data-sort-value="0.98" | 980 m || 
|-id=804 bgcolor=#d6d6d6
| 317804 ||  || — || September 25, 2003 || Haleakala || NEAT || EUP || align=right | 7.7 km || 
|-id=805 bgcolor=#d6d6d6
| 317805 ||  || — || September 26, 2003 || Socorro || LINEAR || EUP || align=right | 4.8 km || 
|-id=806 bgcolor=#fefefe
| 317806 ||  || — || September 28, 2003 || Desert Eagle || W. K. Y. Yeung || — || align=right | 1.3 km || 
|-id=807 bgcolor=#E9E9E9
| 317807 ||  || — || September 26, 2003 || Socorro || LINEAR || — || align=right | 2.9 km || 
|-id=808 bgcolor=#d6d6d6
| 317808 ||  || — || September 26, 2003 || Socorro || LINEAR || — || align=right | 4.3 km || 
|-id=809 bgcolor=#fefefe
| 317809 Marot ||  ||  || September 24, 2003 || Saint-Sulpice || Saint-Sulpice Obs. || — || align=right data-sort-value="0.83" | 830 m || 
|-id=810 bgcolor=#d6d6d6
| 317810 ||  || — || September 26, 2003 || Socorro || LINEAR || — || align=right | 5.5 km || 
|-id=811 bgcolor=#fefefe
| 317811 ||  || — || September 24, 2003 || Palomar || NEAT || NYS || align=right data-sort-value="0.74" | 740 m || 
|-id=812 bgcolor=#fefefe
| 317812 ||  || — || September 25, 2003 || Palomar || NEAT || — || align=right data-sort-value="0.88" | 880 m || 
|-id=813 bgcolor=#fefefe
| 317813 ||  || — || September 26, 2003 || Socorro || LINEAR || — || align=right data-sort-value="0.94" | 940 m || 
|-id=814 bgcolor=#fefefe
| 317814 ||  || — || September 26, 2003 || Socorro || LINEAR || — || align=right | 1.1 km || 
|-id=815 bgcolor=#fefefe
| 317815 ||  || — || September 27, 2003 || Kitt Peak || Spacewatch || — || align=right data-sort-value="0.80" | 800 m || 
|-id=816 bgcolor=#fefefe
| 317816 ||  || — || September 28, 2003 || Socorro || LINEAR || NYS || align=right data-sort-value="0.69" | 690 m || 
|-id=817 bgcolor=#E9E9E9
| 317817 ||  || — || September 28, 2003 || Socorro || LINEAR || — || align=right | 2.0 km || 
|-id=818 bgcolor=#fefefe
| 317818 ||  || — || September 28, 2003 || Socorro || LINEAR || — || align=right | 1.1 km || 
|-id=819 bgcolor=#d6d6d6
| 317819 ||  || — || September 28, 2003 || Socorro || LINEAR || VER || align=right | 3.5 km || 
|-id=820 bgcolor=#d6d6d6
| 317820 ||  || — || September 29, 2003 || Kitt Peak || Spacewatch || VER || align=right | 3.8 km || 
|-id=821 bgcolor=#fefefe
| 317821 ||  || — || September 30, 2003 || Uccle || T. Pauwels || FLO || align=right data-sort-value="0.73" | 730 m || 
|-id=822 bgcolor=#fefefe
| 317822 ||  || — || September 30, 2003 || Socorro || LINEAR || — || align=right | 1.0 km || 
|-id=823 bgcolor=#E9E9E9
| 317823 ||  || — || September 19, 2003 || Kitt Peak || Spacewatch || — || align=right | 2.1 km || 
|-id=824 bgcolor=#fefefe
| 317824 ||  || — || September 20, 2003 || Socorro || LINEAR || — || align=right | 1.1 km || 
|-id=825 bgcolor=#d6d6d6
| 317825 ||  || — || September 28, 2003 || Socorro || LINEAR || — || align=right | 5.3 km || 
|-id=826 bgcolor=#fefefe
| 317826 ||  || — || September 28, 2003 || Socorro || LINEAR || NYS || align=right | 1.1 km || 
|-id=827 bgcolor=#d6d6d6
| 317827 ||  || — || September 27, 2003 || Socorro || LINEAR || — || align=right | 4.3 km || 
|-id=828 bgcolor=#d6d6d6
| 317828 ||  || — || September 28, 2003 || Kitt Peak || Spacewatch || EOS || align=right | 2.4 km || 
|-id=829 bgcolor=#E9E9E9
| 317829 ||  || — || September 17, 2003 || Kitt Peak || Spacewatch || — || align=right | 2.7 km || 
|-id=830 bgcolor=#fefefe
| 317830 ||  || — || September 18, 2003 || Campo Imperatore || CINEOS || V || align=right data-sort-value="0.84" | 840 m || 
|-id=831 bgcolor=#E9E9E9
| 317831 ||  || — || September 19, 2003 || Campo Imperatore || CINEOS || MRX || align=right | 1.4 km || 
|-id=832 bgcolor=#fefefe
| 317832 ||  || — || September 17, 2003 || Kitt Peak || Spacewatch || — || align=right data-sort-value="0.85" | 850 m || 
|-id=833 bgcolor=#d6d6d6
| 317833 ||  || — || September 18, 2003 || Kitt Peak || Spacewatch || — || align=right | 2.2 km || 
|-id=834 bgcolor=#fefefe
| 317834 ||  || — || September 18, 2003 || Kitt Peak || Spacewatch || MAS || align=right data-sort-value="0.68" | 680 m || 
|-id=835 bgcolor=#fefefe
| 317835 ||  || — || September 20, 2003 || Palomar || NEAT || — || align=right data-sort-value="0.94" | 940 m || 
|-id=836 bgcolor=#d6d6d6
| 317836 ||  || — || September 18, 2003 || Palomar || NEAT || — || align=right | 4.5 km || 
|-id=837 bgcolor=#d6d6d6
| 317837 ||  || — || September 26, 2003 || Apache Point || SDSS || — || align=right | 3.0 km || 
|-id=838 bgcolor=#d6d6d6
| 317838 ||  || — || September 26, 2003 || Apache Point || SDSS || — || align=right | 2.7 km || 
|-id=839 bgcolor=#E9E9E9
| 317839 ||  || — || September 26, 2003 || Apache Point || SDSS || — || align=right | 1.6 km || 
|-id=840 bgcolor=#d6d6d6
| 317840 ||  || — || September 27, 2003 || Apache Point || SDSS || EUP || align=right | 6.3 km || 
|-id=841 bgcolor=#E9E9E9
| 317841 ||  || — || September 28, 2003 || Apache Point || SDSS || — || align=right | 1.7 km || 
|-id=842 bgcolor=#E9E9E9
| 317842 ||  || — || September 27, 2003 || Kitt Peak || Spacewatch || — || align=right | 1.7 km || 
|-id=843 bgcolor=#E9E9E9
| 317843 ||  || — || September 25, 2003 || Mauna Kea || P. A. Wiegert || HOF || align=right | 3.1 km || 
|-id=844 bgcolor=#d6d6d6
| 317844 ||  || — || September 25, 2003 || Mauna Kea || P. A. Wiegert || KOR || align=right | 1.5 km || 
|-id=845 bgcolor=#d6d6d6
| 317845 ||  || — || September 17, 2003 || Kitt Peak || Spacewatch || — || align=right | 5.5 km || 
|-id=846 bgcolor=#E9E9E9
| 317846 ||  || — || September 17, 2003 || Kitt Peak || Spacewatch || — || align=right | 1.3 km || 
|-id=847 bgcolor=#d6d6d6
| 317847 ||  || — || September 21, 2003 || Palomar || NEAT || VER || align=right | 4.2 km || 
|-id=848 bgcolor=#fefefe
| 317848 ||  || — || October 1, 2003 || Anderson Mesa || LONEOS || — || align=right | 2.2 km || 
|-id=849 bgcolor=#fefefe
| 317849 ||  || — || October 14, 2003 || Palomar || NEAT || V || align=right data-sort-value="0.73" | 730 m || 
|-id=850 bgcolor=#fefefe
| 317850 ||  || — || October 15, 2003 || Anderson Mesa || LONEOS || — || align=right | 1.2 km || 
|-id=851 bgcolor=#fefefe
| 317851 ||  || — || October 15, 2003 || Anderson Mesa || LONEOS || NYS || align=right data-sort-value="0.85" | 850 m || 
|-id=852 bgcolor=#fefefe
| 317852 ||  || — || October 15, 2003 || Anderson Mesa || LONEOS || — || align=right | 1.4 km || 
|-id=853 bgcolor=#fefefe
| 317853 ||  || — || October 15, 2003 || Palomar || NEAT || MAS || align=right data-sort-value="0.85" | 850 m || 
|-id=854 bgcolor=#d6d6d6
| 317854 ||  || — || October 15, 2003 || Palomar || NEAT || — || align=right | 4.1 km || 
|-id=855 bgcolor=#d6d6d6
| 317855 ||  || — || October 1, 2003 || Kitt Peak || Spacewatch || — || align=right | 4.1 km || 
|-id=856 bgcolor=#d6d6d6
| 317856 ||  || — || October 1, 2003 || Kitt Peak || Spacewatch || — || align=right | 4.6 km || 
|-id=857 bgcolor=#fefefe
| 317857 ||  || — || October 1, 2003 || Kitt Peak || Spacewatch || — || align=right data-sort-value="0.87" | 870 m || 
|-id=858 bgcolor=#fefefe
| 317858 ||  || — || October 2, 2003 || Kitt Peak || Spacewatch || V || align=right data-sort-value="0.68" | 680 m || 
|-id=859 bgcolor=#fefefe
| 317859 ||  || — || October 5, 2003 || Kitt Peak || Spacewatch || V || align=right data-sort-value="0.71" | 710 m || 
|-id=860 bgcolor=#fefefe
| 317860 ||  || — || October 16, 2003 || Socorro || LINEAR || PHO || align=right | 1.3 km || 
|-id=861 bgcolor=#fefefe
| 317861 ||  || — || October 16, 2003 || Kitt Peak || Spacewatch || — || align=right | 1.1 km || 
|-id=862 bgcolor=#E9E9E9
| 317862 ||  || — || October 19, 2003 || Palomar || NEAT || — || align=right | 1.9 km || 
|-id=863 bgcolor=#fefefe
| 317863 ||  || — || October 22, 2003 || Kitt Peak || Spacewatch || NYS || align=right data-sort-value="0.79" | 790 m || 
|-id=864 bgcolor=#E9E9E9
| 317864 ||  || — || October 20, 2003 || Socorro || LINEAR || — || align=right | 1.7 km || 
|-id=865 bgcolor=#d6d6d6
| 317865 ||  || — || October 22, 2003 || Goodricke-Pigott || R. A. Tucker || — || align=right | 3.1 km || 
|-id=866 bgcolor=#fefefe
| 317866 ||  || — || October 20, 2003 || Palomar || NEAT || — || align=right data-sort-value="0.87" | 870 m || 
|-id=867 bgcolor=#E9E9E9
| 317867 ||  || — || October 17, 2003 || Kitt Peak || Spacewatch || HOF || align=right | 2.8 km || 
|-id=868 bgcolor=#fefefe
| 317868 ||  || — || October 16, 2003 || Kitt Peak || Spacewatch || V || align=right data-sort-value="0.71" | 710 m || 
|-id=869 bgcolor=#E9E9E9
| 317869 ||  || — || October 16, 2003 || Kitt Peak || Spacewatch || — || align=right data-sort-value="0.92" | 920 m || 
|-id=870 bgcolor=#fefefe
| 317870 ||  || — || October 24, 2003 || Haleakala || NEAT || H || align=right data-sort-value="0.85" | 850 m || 
|-id=871 bgcolor=#fefefe
| 317871 ||  || — || October 18, 2003 || Palomar || NEAT || — || align=right | 2.1 km || 
|-id=872 bgcolor=#E9E9E9
| 317872 ||  || — || October 18, 2003 || Palomar || NEAT || — || align=right | 4.7 km || 
|-id=873 bgcolor=#E9E9E9
| 317873 ||  || — || October 17, 2003 || Anderson Mesa || LONEOS || — || align=right | 1.8 km || 
|-id=874 bgcolor=#d6d6d6
| 317874 ||  || — || October 16, 2003 || Kitt Peak || Spacewatch || — || align=right | 3.6 km || 
|-id=875 bgcolor=#fefefe
| 317875 ||  || — || October 17, 2003 || Kitt Peak || Spacewatch || — || align=right | 1.4 km || 
|-id=876 bgcolor=#E9E9E9
| 317876 ||  || — || October 18, 2003 || Kitt Peak || Spacewatch || WIT || align=right | 1.3 km || 
|-id=877 bgcolor=#fefefe
| 317877 ||  || — || October 18, 2003 || Kitt Peak || Spacewatch || NYS || align=right data-sort-value="0.73" | 730 m || 
|-id=878 bgcolor=#fefefe
| 317878 ||  || — || October 20, 2003 || Socorro || LINEAR || — || align=right data-sort-value="0.91" | 910 m || 
|-id=879 bgcolor=#fefefe
| 317879 ||  || — || October 20, 2003 || Socorro || LINEAR || — || align=right | 1.2 km || 
|-id=880 bgcolor=#fefefe
| 317880 ||  || — || October 20, 2003 || Palomar || NEAT || — || align=right data-sort-value="0.86" | 860 m || 
|-id=881 bgcolor=#fefefe
| 317881 ||  || — || October 21, 2003 || Socorro || LINEAR || NYS || align=right | 1.1 km || 
|-id=882 bgcolor=#E9E9E9
| 317882 ||  || — || October 21, 2003 || Socorro || LINEAR || — || align=right | 2.2 km || 
|-id=883 bgcolor=#E9E9E9
| 317883 ||  || — || October 18, 2003 || Kitt Peak || Spacewatch || HOF || align=right | 3.0 km || 
|-id=884 bgcolor=#d6d6d6
| 317884 ||  || — || October 19, 2003 || Kitt Peak || Spacewatch || EOS || align=right | 3.1 km || 
|-id=885 bgcolor=#d6d6d6
| 317885 ||  || — || October 16, 2003 || Palomar || NEAT || EOS || align=right | 3.0 km || 
|-id=886 bgcolor=#fefefe
| 317886 ||  || — || October 18, 2003 || Anderson Mesa || LONEOS || — || align=right | 1.1 km || 
|-id=887 bgcolor=#fefefe
| 317887 ||  || — || October 20, 2003 || Kitt Peak || Spacewatch || — || align=right | 1.3 km || 
|-id=888 bgcolor=#fefefe
| 317888 ||  || — || October 19, 2003 || Kitt Peak || Spacewatch || — || align=right | 1.0 km || 
|-id=889 bgcolor=#fefefe
| 317889 ||  || — || October 21, 2003 || Kitt Peak || Spacewatch || — || align=right data-sort-value="0.82" | 820 m || 
|-id=890 bgcolor=#fefefe
| 317890 ||  || — || October 21, 2003 || Kitt Peak || Spacewatch || NYS || align=right data-sort-value="0.70" | 700 m || 
|-id=891 bgcolor=#fefefe
| 317891 ||  || — || October 21, 2003 || Socorro || LINEAR || — || align=right | 1.0 km || 
|-id=892 bgcolor=#fefefe
| 317892 ||  || — || October 21, 2003 || Palomar || NEAT || — || align=right data-sort-value="0.89" | 890 m || 
|-id=893 bgcolor=#E9E9E9
| 317893 ||  || — || October 21, 2003 || Palomar || NEAT || — || align=right | 1.6 km || 
|-id=894 bgcolor=#d6d6d6
| 317894 ||  || — || October 22, 2003 || Kitt Peak || Spacewatch || — || align=right | 4.8 km || 
|-id=895 bgcolor=#E9E9E9
| 317895 ||  || — || October 21, 2003 || Kitt Peak || Spacewatch || — || align=right | 2.4 km || 
|-id=896 bgcolor=#fefefe
| 317896 ||  || — || October 21, 2003 || Kitt Peak || Spacewatch || — || align=right data-sort-value="0.91" | 910 m || 
|-id=897 bgcolor=#E9E9E9
| 317897 ||  || — || October 23, 2003 || Kitt Peak || Spacewatch || — || align=right | 1.8 km || 
|-id=898 bgcolor=#E9E9E9
| 317898 ||  || — || October 23, 2003 || Kitt Peak || Spacewatch || — || align=right | 2.6 km || 
|-id=899 bgcolor=#fefefe
| 317899 ||  || — || October 21, 2003 || Kitt Peak || Spacewatch || NYS || align=right data-sort-value="0.73" | 730 m || 
|-id=900 bgcolor=#fefefe
| 317900 ||  || — || October 21, 2003 || Socorro || LINEAR || — || align=right data-sort-value="0.91" | 910 m || 
|}

317901–318000 

|-bgcolor=#fefefe
| 317901 ||  || — || October 22, 2003 || Socorro || LINEAR || — || align=right | 1.1 km || 
|-id=902 bgcolor=#fefefe
| 317902 ||  || — || October 23, 2003 || Kitt Peak || Spacewatch || — || align=right data-sort-value="0.93" | 930 m || 
|-id=903 bgcolor=#fefefe
| 317903 ||  || — || October 23, 2003 || Anderson Mesa || LONEOS || NYS || align=right data-sort-value="0.89" | 890 m || 
|-id=904 bgcolor=#fefefe
| 317904 ||  || — || October 24, 2003 || Kitt Peak || Spacewatch || — || align=right | 1.1 km || 
|-id=905 bgcolor=#E9E9E9
| 317905 ||  || — || October 25, 2003 || Socorro || LINEAR || NEM || align=right | 3.3 km || 
|-id=906 bgcolor=#E9E9E9
| 317906 ||  || — || October 25, 2003 || Socorro || LINEAR || MIS || align=right | 3.6 km || 
|-id=907 bgcolor=#fefefe
| 317907 ||  || — || October 25, 2003 || Socorro || LINEAR || — || align=right | 1.2 km || 
|-id=908 bgcolor=#fefefe
| 317908 ||  || — || October 26, 2003 || Kitt Peak || Spacewatch || — || align=right | 1.1 km || 
|-id=909 bgcolor=#d6d6d6
| 317909 ||  || — || October 27, 2003 || Kitt Peak || Spacewatch || — || align=right | 4.0 km || 
|-id=910 bgcolor=#fefefe
| 317910 ||  || — || October 29, 2003 || Catalina || CSS || NYS || align=right data-sort-value="0.72" | 720 m || 
|-id=911 bgcolor=#E9E9E9
| 317911 ||  || — || October 25, 2003 || Socorro || LINEAR || AGN || align=right | 1.4 km || 
|-id=912 bgcolor=#fefefe
| 317912 ||  || — || October 27, 2003 || Socorro || LINEAR || V || align=right data-sort-value="0.80" | 800 m || 
|-id=913 bgcolor=#fefefe
| 317913 ||  || — || October 23, 2003 || Kitt Peak || M. W. Buie || — || align=right data-sort-value="0.75" | 750 m || 
|-id=914 bgcolor=#fefefe
| 317914 ||  || — || October 23, 2003 || Kitt Peak || Spacewatch || MAS || align=right data-sort-value="0.80" | 800 m || 
|-id=915 bgcolor=#fefefe
| 317915 ||  || — || October 17, 2003 || Kitt Peak || Spacewatch || — || align=right data-sort-value="0.93" | 930 m || 
|-id=916 bgcolor=#fefefe
| 317916 ||  || — || October 18, 2003 || Kitt Peak || Spacewatch || V || align=right data-sort-value="0.70" | 700 m || 
|-id=917 bgcolor=#d6d6d6
| 317917 Jodelle ||  ||  || October 21, 2003 || Saint-Sulpice || Saint-Sulpice Obs. || HYG || align=right | 2.8 km || 
|-id=918 bgcolor=#d6d6d6
| 317918 ||  || — || October 16, 2003 || Kitt Peak || Spacewatch || — || align=right | 4.9 km || 
|-id=919 bgcolor=#d6d6d6
| 317919 ||  || — || October 17, 2003 || Apache Point || SDSS || — || align=right | 3.6 km || 
|-id=920 bgcolor=#d6d6d6
| 317920 ||  || — || October 17, 2003 || Apache Point || SDSS || — || align=right | 4.1 km || 
|-id=921 bgcolor=#fefefe
| 317921 ||  || — || October 18, 2003 || Apache Point || SDSS || MAS || align=right data-sort-value="0.64" | 640 m || 
|-id=922 bgcolor=#d6d6d6
| 317922 ||  || — || October 18, 2003 || Apache Point || SDSS || VER || align=right | 4.1 km || 
|-id=923 bgcolor=#d6d6d6
| 317923 ||  || — || September 27, 2003 || Kitt Peak || Spacewatch || HYG || align=right | 3.1 km || 
|-id=924 bgcolor=#d6d6d6
| 317924 ||  || — || October 19, 2003 || Apache Point || SDSS || HYG || align=right | 3.1 km || 
|-id=925 bgcolor=#fefefe
| 317925 ||  || — || October 19, 2003 || Apache Point || SDSS || NYS || align=right data-sort-value="0.72" | 720 m || 
|-id=926 bgcolor=#fefefe
| 317926 ||  || — || October 19, 2003 || Apache Point || SDSS || — || align=right | 1.4 km || 
|-id=927 bgcolor=#d6d6d6
| 317927 ||  || — || October 19, 2003 || Apache Point || SDSS || — || align=right | 2.8 km || 
|-id=928 bgcolor=#d6d6d6
| 317928 ||  || — || October 21, 2003 || Kitt Peak || Spacewatch || — || align=right | 3.2 km || 
|-id=929 bgcolor=#d6d6d6
| 317929 ||  || — || October 22, 2003 || Apache Point || SDSS || VER || align=right | 4.2 km || 
|-id=930 bgcolor=#fefefe
| 317930 ||  || — || October 22, 2003 || Apache Point || SDSS || ERI || align=right | 1.2 km || 
|-id=931 bgcolor=#fefefe
| 317931 ||  || — || November 2, 2003 || Socorro || LINEAR || — || align=right | 1.2 km || 
|-id=932 bgcolor=#fefefe
| 317932 ||  || — || November 16, 2003 || Kitt Peak || Spacewatch || MAS || align=right data-sort-value="0.79" | 790 m || 
|-id=933 bgcolor=#d6d6d6
| 317933 ||  || — || October 27, 2003 || Kitt Peak || Spacewatch || — || align=right | 3.6 km || 
|-id=934 bgcolor=#E9E9E9
| 317934 ||  || — || November 18, 2003 || Palomar || NEAT || — || align=right | 4.5 km || 
|-id=935 bgcolor=#d6d6d6
| 317935 ||  || — || November 18, 2003 || Palomar || NEAT || — || align=right | 4.5 km || 
|-id=936 bgcolor=#E9E9E9
| 317936 ||  || — || November 18, 2003 || Palomar || NEAT || — || align=right | 3.3 km || 
|-id=937 bgcolor=#fefefe
| 317937 ||  || — || November 19, 2003 || Palomar || NEAT || V || align=right data-sort-value="0.67" | 670 m || 
|-id=938 bgcolor=#E9E9E9
| 317938 ||  || — || November 18, 2003 || Palomar || NEAT || — || align=right | 1.6 km || 
|-id=939 bgcolor=#fefefe
| 317939 ||  || — || October 29, 2003 || Anderson Mesa || LONEOS || FLO || align=right data-sort-value="0.76" | 760 m || 
|-id=940 bgcolor=#fefefe
| 317940 ||  || — || November 19, 2003 || Kitt Peak || Spacewatch || ERI || align=right | 1.9 km || 
|-id=941 bgcolor=#E9E9E9
| 317941 ||  || — || November 20, 2003 || Socorro || LINEAR || — || align=right | 2.8 km || 
|-id=942 bgcolor=#fefefe
| 317942 ||  || — || November 18, 2003 || Palomar || NEAT || NYS || align=right data-sort-value="0.77" | 770 m || 
|-id=943 bgcolor=#fefefe
| 317943 ||  || — || November 18, 2003 || Kitt Peak || Spacewatch || — || align=right data-sort-value="0.98" | 980 m || 
|-id=944 bgcolor=#fefefe
| 317944 ||  || — || November 19, 2003 || Kitt Peak || Spacewatch || — || align=right | 1.3 km || 
|-id=945 bgcolor=#d6d6d6
| 317945 ||  || — || November 19, 2003 || Kitt Peak || Spacewatch || — || align=right | 3.4 km || 
|-id=946 bgcolor=#E9E9E9
| 317946 ||  || — || November 19, 2003 || Socorro || LINEAR || — || align=right | 3.4 km || 
|-id=947 bgcolor=#fefefe
| 317947 ||  || — || November 20, 2003 || Socorro || LINEAR || FLO || align=right | 1.1 km || 
|-id=948 bgcolor=#fefefe
| 317948 ||  || — || November 19, 2003 || Catalina || CSS || — || align=right | 1.2 km || 
|-id=949 bgcolor=#d6d6d6
| 317949 ||  || — || November 19, 2003 || Anderson Mesa || LONEOS || — || align=right | 3.7 km || 
|-id=950 bgcolor=#fefefe
| 317950 ||  || — || October 20, 2003 || Kitt Peak || Spacewatch || NYS || align=right data-sort-value="0.60" | 600 m || 
|-id=951 bgcolor=#fefefe
| 317951 ||  || — || November 21, 2003 || Socorro || LINEAR || — || align=right data-sort-value="0.73" | 730 m || 
|-id=952 bgcolor=#fefefe
| 317952 ||  || — || November 21, 2003 || Socorro || LINEAR || NYS || align=right | 1.0 km || 
|-id=953 bgcolor=#fefefe
| 317953 ||  || — || November 24, 2003 || Anderson Mesa || LONEOS || ERI || align=right | 1.5 km || 
|-id=954 bgcolor=#d6d6d6
| 317954 ||  || — || November 30, 2003 || Kitt Peak || Spacewatch || — || align=right | 3.5 km || 
|-id=955 bgcolor=#d6d6d6
| 317955 ||  || — || November 30, 2003 || Kitt Peak || Spacewatch || K-2 || align=right | 1.7 km || 
|-id=956 bgcolor=#fefefe
| 317956 ||  || — || November 19, 2003 || Kitt Peak || Spacewatch || MAS || align=right data-sort-value="0.72" | 720 m || 
|-id=957 bgcolor=#E9E9E9
| 317957 ||  || — || November 16, 2003 || Apache Point || SDSS || EUN || align=right | 1.5 km || 
|-id=958 bgcolor=#FA8072
| 317958 ||  || — || December 3, 2003 || Socorro || LINEAR || unusual || align=right | 5.4 km || 
|-id=959 bgcolor=#fefefe
| 317959 ||  || — || December 15, 2003 || Socorro || LINEAR || — || align=right | 2.2 km || 
|-id=960 bgcolor=#d6d6d6
| 317960 ||  || — || December 14, 2003 || Palomar || NEAT || EOS || align=right | 2.8 km || 
|-id=961 bgcolor=#fefefe
| 317961 ||  || — || November 21, 2003 || Socorro || LINEAR || V || align=right data-sort-value="0.88" | 880 m || 
|-id=962 bgcolor=#fefefe
| 317962 ||  || — || December 17, 2003 || Kitt Peak || Spacewatch || — || align=right | 1.2 km || 
|-id=963 bgcolor=#fefefe
| 317963 ||  || — || December 21, 2003 || Socorro || LINEAR || H || align=right data-sort-value="0.65" | 650 m || 
|-id=964 bgcolor=#E9E9E9
| 317964 ||  || — || December 18, 2003 || Socorro || LINEAR || — || align=right | 2.7 km || 
|-id=965 bgcolor=#fefefe
| 317965 ||  || — || December 19, 2003 || Socorro || LINEAR || NYS || align=right data-sort-value="0.81" | 810 m || 
|-id=966 bgcolor=#fefefe
| 317966 ||  || — || December 19, 2003 || Socorro || LINEAR || — || align=right data-sort-value="0.98" | 980 m || 
|-id=967 bgcolor=#fefefe
| 317967 ||  || — || December 19, 2003 || Kitt Peak || Spacewatch || V || align=right data-sort-value="0.79" | 790 m || 
|-id=968 bgcolor=#fefefe
| 317968 ||  || — || December 19, 2003 || Socorro || LINEAR || — || align=right | 1.3 km || 
|-id=969 bgcolor=#fefefe
| 317969 ||  || — || December 19, 2003 || Kitt Peak || Spacewatch || MAS || align=right data-sort-value="0.95" | 950 m || 
|-id=970 bgcolor=#fefefe
| 317970 ||  || — || December 18, 2003 || Socorro || LINEAR || — || align=right | 1.9 km || 
|-id=971 bgcolor=#fefefe
| 317971 ||  || — || December 18, 2003 || Socorro || LINEAR || V || align=right data-sort-value="0.90" | 900 m || 
|-id=972 bgcolor=#E9E9E9
| 317972 ||  || — || December 18, 2003 || Socorro || LINEAR || — || align=right | 1.6 km || 
|-id=973 bgcolor=#fefefe
| 317973 ||  || — || December 19, 2003 || Kitt Peak || Spacewatch || NYS || align=right data-sort-value="0.77" | 770 m || 
|-id=974 bgcolor=#fefefe
| 317974 ||  || — || December 27, 2003 || Desert Eagle || W. K. Y. Yeung || MAS || align=right data-sort-value="0.93" | 930 m || 
|-id=975 bgcolor=#E9E9E9
| 317975 ||  || — || December 27, 2003 || Socorro || LINEAR || — || align=right | 3.9 km || 
|-id=976 bgcolor=#fefefe
| 317976 ||  || — || December 23, 2003 || Socorro || LINEAR || H || align=right data-sort-value="0.92" | 920 m || 
|-id=977 bgcolor=#E9E9E9
| 317977 ||  || — || December 28, 2003 || Socorro || LINEAR || — || align=right | 1.6 km || 
|-id=978 bgcolor=#E9E9E9
| 317978 ||  || — || December 28, 2003 || Socorro || LINEAR || EUN || align=right | 1.5 km || 
|-id=979 bgcolor=#d6d6d6
| 317979 ||  || — || December 28, 2003 || Kitt Peak || Spacewatch || — || align=right | 4.7 km || 
|-id=980 bgcolor=#d6d6d6
| 317980 ||  || — || December 29, 2003 || Socorro || LINEAR || SYL7:4 || align=right | 6.1 km || 
|-id=981 bgcolor=#fefefe
| 317981 ||  || — || December 18, 2003 || Kitt Peak || Spacewatch || NYS || align=right data-sort-value="0.82" | 820 m || 
|-id=982 bgcolor=#fefefe
| 317982 ||  || — || January 12, 2004 || Palomar || NEAT || — || align=right | 1.3 km || 
|-id=983 bgcolor=#d6d6d6
| 317983 ||  || — || January 15, 2004 || Kitt Peak || Spacewatch || — || align=right | 4.3 km || 
|-id=984 bgcolor=#FA8072
| 317984 ||  || — || January 16, 2004 || Palomar || NEAT || — || align=right | 3.4 km || 
|-id=985 bgcolor=#E9E9E9
| 317985 ||  || — || January 16, 2004 || Palomar || NEAT || — || align=right | 1.4 km || 
|-id=986 bgcolor=#d6d6d6
| 317986 ||  || — || January 19, 2004 || Kitt Peak || Spacewatch || — || align=right | 4.8 km || 
|-id=987 bgcolor=#fefefe
| 317987 ||  || — || January 19, 2004 || Kitt Peak || Spacewatch || — || align=right | 1.2 km || 
|-id=988 bgcolor=#fefefe
| 317988 ||  || — || January 19, 2004 || Kitt Peak || Spacewatch || V || align=right data-sort-value="0.78" | 780 m || 
|-id=989 bgcolor=#E9E9E9
| 317989 ||  || — || January 21, 2004 || Socorro || LINEAR || — || align=right | 2.3 km || 
|-id=990 bgcolor=#fefefe
| 317990 ||  || — || January 26, 2004 || Kingsnake || J. V. McClusky || — || align=right | 1.3 km || 
|-id=991 bgcolor=#d6d6d6
| 317991 ||  || — || January 22, 2004 || Socorro || LINEAR || EOS || align=right | 2.7 km || 
|-id=992 bgcolor=#d6d6d6
| 317992 ||  || — || January 22, 2004 || Socorro || LINEAR || — || align=right | 3.0 km || 
|-id=993 bgcolor=#fefefe
| 317993 ||  || — || January 27, 2004 || Catalina || CSS || — || align=right | 1.1 km || 
|-id=994 bgcolor=#fefefe
| 317994 ||  || — || January 27, 2004 || Catalina || CSS || H || align=right data-sort-value="0.78" | 780 m || 
|-id=995 bgcolor=#E9E9E9
| 317995 ||  || — || January 31, 2004 || Socorro || LINEAR || — || align=right | 1.4 km || 
|-id=996 bgcolor=#d6d6d6
| 317996 ||  || — || January 19, 2004 || Kitt Peak || Spacewatch || 7:4 || align=right | 4.9 km || 
|-id=997 bgcolor=#fefefe
| 317997 ||  || — || January 16, 2004 || Palomar || NEAT || NYS || align=right data-sort-value="0.82" | 820 m || 
|-id=998 bgcolor=#fefefe
| 317998 ||  || — || January 16, 2004 || Palomar || NEAT || — || align=right | 1.2 km || 
|-id=999 bgcolor=#d6d6d6
| 317999 ||  || — || January 17, 2004 || Palomar || NEAT || — || align=right | 3.7 km || 
|-id=000 bgcolor=#E9E9E9
| 318000 ||  || — || February 11, 2004 || Kitt Peak || Spacewatch || AGN || align=right | 1.7 km || 
|}

References

External links 
 Discovery Circumstances: Numbered Minor Planets (315001)–(320000) (IAU Minor Planet Center)

0317